= Riau-Lingga Sultanate =

1824–1911 Malay sultanate in Southeast Asia

Riau-Lingga Sultanate Kesultanan Riau-Lingga کسلطانن رياوليڠݢ (Jawi)
- 1824–1911
- Flag Coat of arms

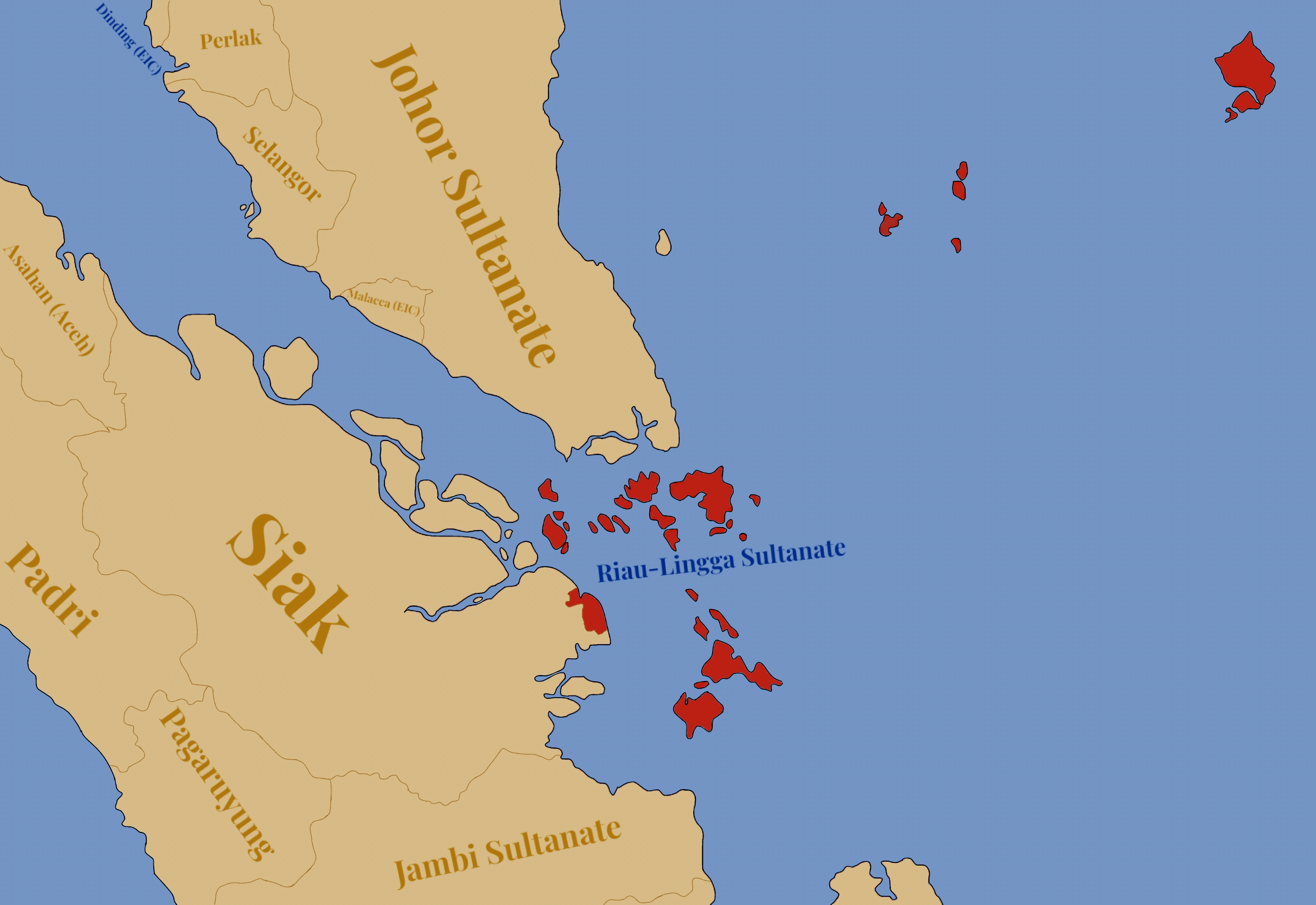
- The dominion of Riau-Lingga Sultanate in red, consisting of many islands in the South China Sea and enclave in Kateman, Sumatra.
- Status: Dutch protectorate
- Capital: Tanjungpinang (Administrative 1824–1900) (Royal and administrative 1900–1911); Daik (Royal 1824–1900)
- Common languages: Malay
- Religion: Sunni Islam
- Government: Monarchy
- Sultan
  - 1819–1832: Abdul Rahman Muazzam Shah
  - 1832–1835: Muhammad II
  - 1835–1857: Mahmud IV
  - 1857–1883: Sulaiman II
  - 1885–1911: Abdul Rahman II
- Yang di-Pertuan Muda
  - 1805–1831: Jaafar
  - 1831–1844: Abdul
  - 1844–1857: Ali II
  - 1857–1858: Abdullah
  - 1858–1899: Muhammad Yusuf
- Historical era: Dutch Empire
  - Anglo-Dutch Treaty of 1824: 2 June 1824
  - Abolished by the Dutch: 11 February 1911
| Preceded by | Succeeded by |
| Johor Sultanate | Dutch East Indies |
- Today part of: Indonesia

This is the sound of the Nobat of the Riau-Lingga sultanate

Riau-Lingga Sultanate (Jawi: کسلطانن رياوليڠݢ, romanized: Kesultanan Riau-Lingga), also known as the Lingga-Riau Sultanate, Riau Sultanate or Lingga Sultanate was a Malay sultanate that existed from 1824 to 1911, before being dissolved following Dutch intervention.

The sultanate came into existence as a result of the partition of the Johor-Riau Sultanate that separated Johor on the Malay Peninsula and the island of Singapore, from the Riau Archipelago. This partition followed the succession dispute following the death of Mahmud III of Johor, when Abdul Rahman was crowned as the first Sultan of Riau-Lingga. The maritime kingdom was recognised by both the British and the Dutch following the Anglo-Dutch Treaty of 1824.

Its historical territory is almost parallel to the present-day Riau Islands Province, Indonesia.

== History ==
=== Background ===
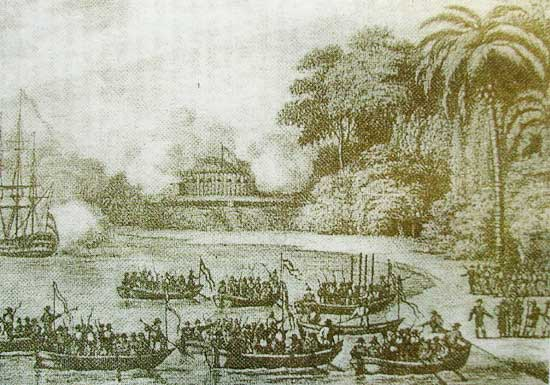
The region witnessed the invasion of Haji Fisabillah of Johor-Riau during the battle against the Dutch East India Company on 6 January 1784 in Tanjung Pinang, Riau. It was one of the largest military campaign in the Strait of Malacca during the 18th century.

The Riau Archipelago became a part of the Malaccan Sultanate after the expansion by Tun Perak in the 15th century, following the decline of the Srivijaya Empire. After the fall of Malacca at the hands of the Portuguese, the axis of regional power was inherited by the Johor Sultanate. During the golden age of Johor, the kingdom stretched across half of the Malay Peninsula, eastern Sumatra, Singapore, Bangka, Jambi and the Riau Islands.

According to the 1849 Johor Annals, on 27 September 1673 the Laksamana (admiral) of Johor, Tun Abdul Jamil, was ordered by Abdul Jalil Shah III to found a settlement in Sungai Carang, Ulu Riau, on Bintan Island. The settlement in Sungai Carang was later known as Riau Lama. Initially a fortress to protect the Johor Empire, Riau Lama then prospered and became an increasingly prominent entrepôt for regional trade in the Strait of Malacca.

Ulu Riau became the capital of Johor during the reign of Sultan Ibrahim when he relocated the capital from Batu Sawar, Kota Tinggi in Peninsular Johor after the old capital was sacked by Jambi forces on 4 October 1722. Riau Lama then became the capital of the empire for 65 years, from 1722 to 1787.

The importance of Lingga began during the reign of Mahmud Shah III. In 1788, he relocated the capital from Riau Lama, Ulu Riau, Bintan to Daik, Lingga. The Sultan did this as he believed that he was being reduced to a mere figurehead under the Dutch. He then requested aid from his distant relative, Raja Ismail, a local ruler of Tempasuk to organise a successful campaign against the Dutch. Out of fear of retaliation by the Dutch, he organised a mass transfer of the populace: the Sultan left for Lingga with 2000 people, the bendahara (high advisor) went to Pahang with 1000 people while others headed to Terengganu. When the Dutch arrived in Riau, there were only a few Chinese planters left, who persuaded the Dutch not to chase the Malays.

The Sultan then developed Lingga and welcomed new settlers to the island. Dato Kaya Megat was appointed as the new Bendahara of Lingga. New dwellings were constructed, roads were built and buildings were improved. He found unprecedented new wealth when tin mines were organised in Singkep. Both the British and Dutch then restored his claim on the Riau island. He began to revive maritime trade discreetly with the British as a major source of commodities, especially valuable tin, gambier and spices.

=== Succession crisis and Sultan Abdul Rahman ===
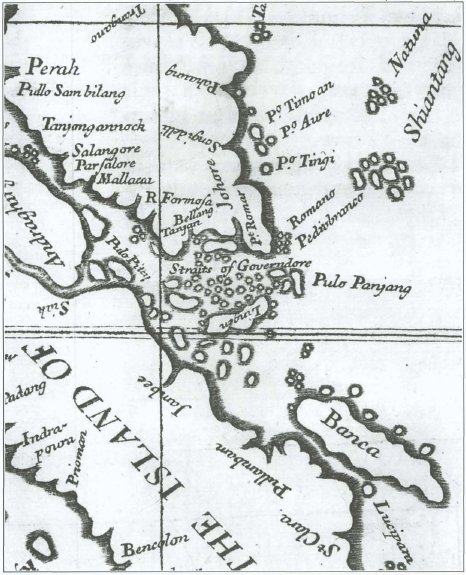
Alexander Hamilton's "A Map of the Dominions of Johore and of the Island of Sumatra with the Adjacent Islands" (1727). Illustrating mainland Johore, eastern Sumatra, Singapore, Bangka and Riau Archipelago as a single political entity, the map was made a century prior to the partition of 1824.

In 1812, the Johor-Riau Sultanate experienced a succession crisis. The death of the Mahmud Shah III in Lingga left no heir apparent. Royal custom required that the succeeding sultan must be present at his predecessor's deathbed. However at the time Mahmud Shah III died, the eldest prince, Tengku Hussein, was in Pahang to celebrate his marriage to the daughter of the Bendahara (governor). The other candidate was Tengku Hussein's half-brother, Tengku Abdul Rahman. To complicate matters, neither of the candidates was of full royal blood. The mother of Tengku Hussein, Cik Mariam, owed her origin to a Balinese slave lady and a Bugis commoner. Tengku Abdul Rahman had a similarly lowborn mother, Cik Halimah. The only unquestionably royal wife and consort of Mahmud Shah was Engku Puteri Hamidah, whose only child had died an hour after birth.

In the following chaos, Engku Puteri was expected to install Tengku Hussein as the next sultan, because he had been preferred by the late Mahmud Shah. Based on the royal adat (customary observance), the consent of Engku Puteri was crucial as she was the holder of the Cogan (Royal Regalia) of Johor-Riau, and the installation of a new sultan was only valid if it took place with the regalia. The regalia was fundamental to the installation of the sultan; it was a symbol of power, legitimacy and the sovereignty of the state.

Nonetheless, Yang di-Pertuan Muda Ja'afar (then-viceroy of the sultanate) supported the reluctant Tengku Abdul Rahman, adhering to the rules of royal protocol, as he had been present at the late Sultan's deathbed. Unwilling and furious, the outspoken Queen is then reported to have said, "Who elected Abdul Rahman as sovereign of Johor? Was it my brother Raja Ja'afar or by what law of succession has it happened? It is owing to this act of injustice that the ancient empire of Johor is fast falling to decay".

Rivalry between the British and the Dutch now came into play. The British had earlier gained Malacca from the Dutch under the Treaty of The Hague in 1795 and saw an opportunity to increase their regional influence. They crowned Tengku Hussein in Singapore, and he took the title Hussein Shah of Johor. The British were actively involved in the Johor-Riau administration between 1812 and 1818, and their intervention further strengthened their dominance in the Strait of Malacca. The British recognised Johor-Riau as a sovereign state and offered to pay Engku Puteri 50,000 Ringgits (Spanish Coins) for the royal regalia, which she refused.

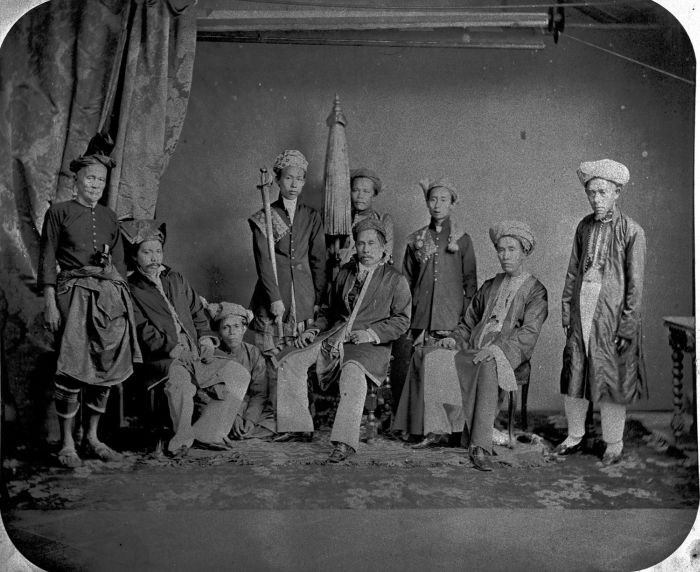
The Riau-Lingga noblemen with Sultan Sulaiman II (seated, in the middle). (c.1867)

Seeing the diplomatic advantage gained in the region by the British, the Dutch responded by crowning Tengku Abdul Rahman as sultan instead. They also obtained, at the Congress of Vienna, a withdrawal of British recognition of Johor-Riau sovereignty. To further curtail the British domination over the region, the Dutch entered into an agreement with the Johor-Riau Sultanate on 27 November 1818. The agreement stipulated that the Dutch were to be the paramount leaders of the Johor-Riau Sultanate and that only Dutch people could engage in trade with the kingdom. A Dutch garrison was then stationed in Riau. The Dutch also secured an agreement that Dutch consent was required for all future appointments of Johor-Riau Sultans. This agreement was signed by Yang Dipertuan Muda Raja Ja'afar representing Abdul Rahman, without the sultan's consent or knowledge.

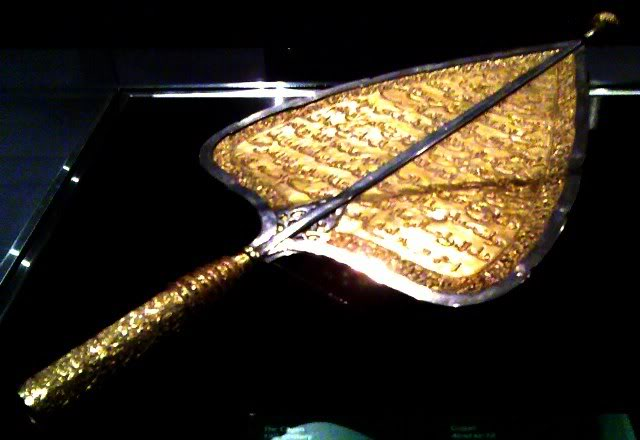
Cogan, the Royal Regalia of Johor-Riau. The coronation of the sultan would be only be official if the regalia were used. This caused both the British and the Dutch to try to claim the regalia from Engku Puteri Hamidah in order to install their preferred sultan.

Just as the British had done, both the Dutch and Yang Dipertuan Muda then desperately tried to win the royal regalia from Engku Puteri. The reluctant Abdul Rahman, believing he was not the rightful heir, decided to move from Lingga to Terengganu, claiming that he wanted to celebrate his marriage. The Dutch, who desired to control the Johor-Riau Empire, feared losing momentum because of the absence of mere regalia. They therefore ordered Timmerman Tyssen, the Dutch Governor of Malacca, to seize Penyengat in October 1822 and remove the royal regalia from Tengku Hamidah by force. The regalia was then stored in the Kroonprins (Dutch: Crown Prince's) Fort in Tanjung Pinang. Engku Puteri was reported to have written a letter to Van Der Capellen, the Dutch Governor in Batavia, about this issue. With the royal regalia in Dutch hands, Abdul Rahman was invited from Terengganu and proclaimed as the Sultan of Johor, Riau-Lingga and Pahang on 27 November 1822. Hence, the legitimate ruler of the Johor-Riau Empire was now Abdul Rahman, rather than the British-backed Hussein.

This led to the partition of Johor-Riau under the Anglo-Dutch treaty of 1824, by which the region north of the Singapore Strait including the island of Singapore and Johor were to be under British influence, while the south of the strait along with Riau and Lingga were to be controlled by the Dutch. By installing two sultans from the same kingdom, both the British and the Dutch effectively destroyed the Johor-Riau polity and satisfied their colonial ambitions.

Under the treaty, Tengku Abdul Rahman was crowned as the Sultan of Riau-Lingga, bearing the name of Sultan Abdul Rahman, with the royal seat in Daik, Lingga. Tengku Hussein, backed by the British, was installed as the Sultan of Johore and ruled over Singapore and the Peninsular Johor. He later ceded Singapore to the British in return for their support during the dispute. Both sultans of Johor and Riau acted mainly as puppet monarchs under the guidance of the colonial powers.

=== Sultan Mahmud IV and the crisis of 1857 ===
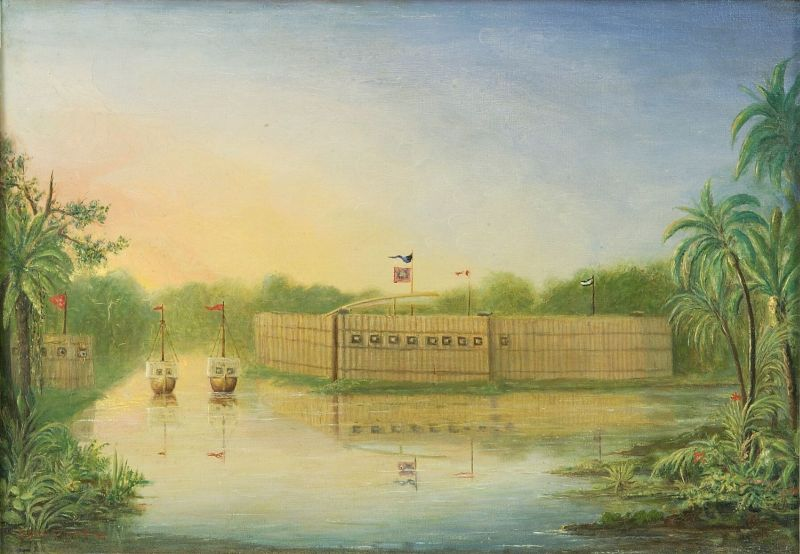
A fort in Reteh, Indragiri, on mainland Sumatra (c. 1857). One of the territory held by the Sultanate. The fort was constructed by Tengku Sulung in retaliation of the appointment of Sultan Sulaiman and the Dutch rule whom contested control over the area.

During the reign of Mahmud IV, increasing tensions developed with Dutch administrators. The Sultan felt that his kingdom was being heavily manipulated by the Dutch and the Yang di-Pertuan Muda, and wanted to throw off their yoke. He frequently traveled to Singapore, Terengganu and Pahang to gain recognition for his rule by the British, and support from his circle of kin in other Malay Royal Houses against the viceregal house of Riau, who came from Bugis stock. He also asserted his claim to be the rightful heir of the preceding Johor-Riau throne, rather than Hussein Shah of Johor. The sultan's actions were met with suspicion by the British, who warned the Dutch that as their vassal, he was in breach of the Anglo-Dutch Treaty of 1824. Angered and embarrassed by the Sultan, the Dutch then prohibited him from travelling without their consent. He ignored this prohibition.

The crisis reached its peak in 1857 when, following the death of the Yang di-Pertuan, the Sultan delayed in naming his successor. This was due to the fact that the Sultan do not approve of any of the candidates offered by the Yang di-Pertuan's family. The Sultan then tried to name a candidate from Singapore and claimed that the revenues gained by the Yang di-Pertuan ought to be paid to him. The final blow came when he decided to sail to Singapore without naming a viceroy, despite the Dutch travel prohibition. The Dutch therefore deposed him on 7 October 1857 while he was in Singapore. He then remained in Singapore and sought mediation with the Dutch, but the British decided not to interfere in the issue.

=== Sultan Badrul Alam Syah II ===
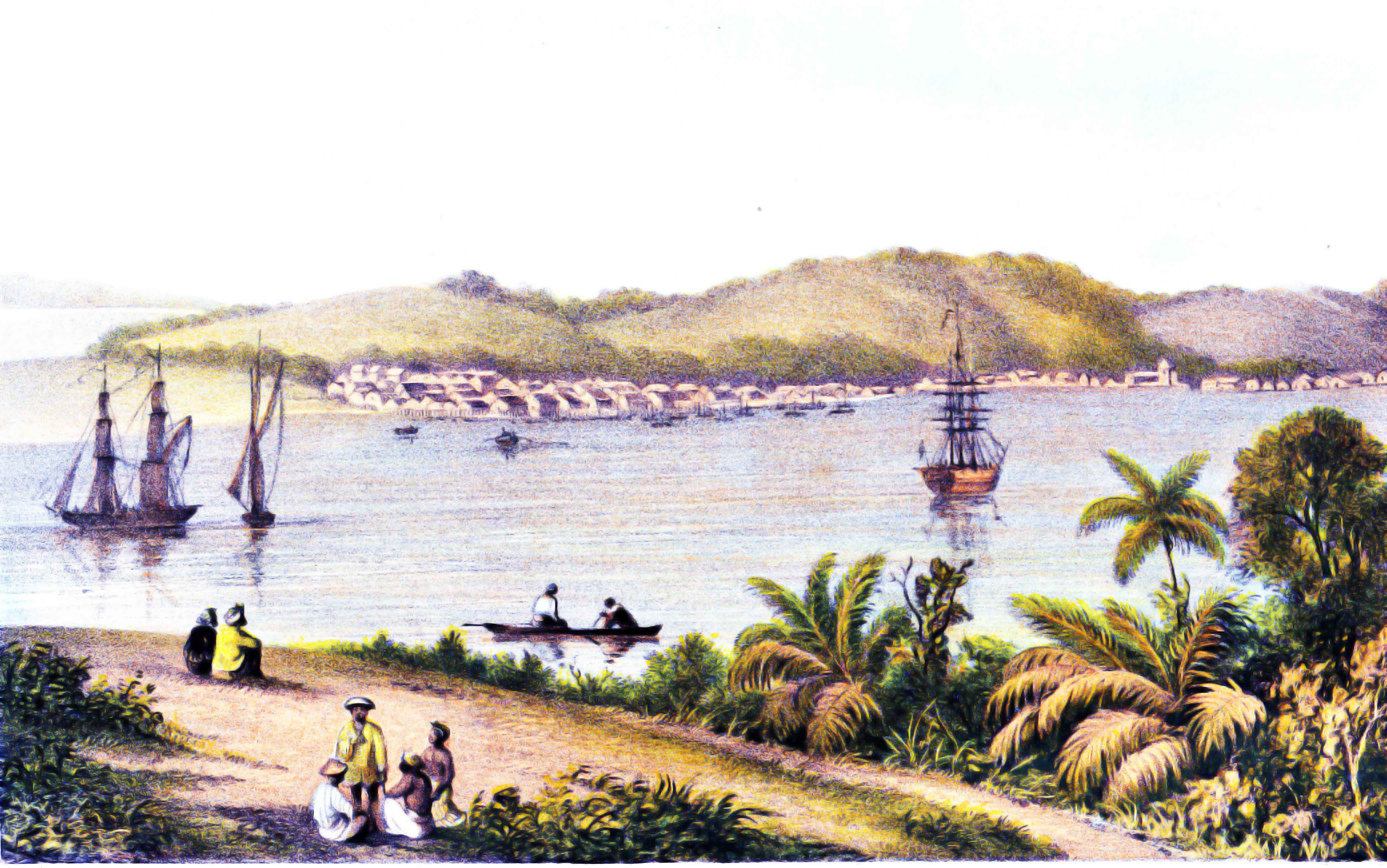
Tandjoengpinang in 1859

In Riau, the Dutch and Yang di-Pertuan then enthroned Mahmud IV's uncle, Sultan Badrul Alam Syah II as the fourth Sultan of Riau (1857–1883). He was assisted by Yang di-Pertuan IX Raja Haji Abdullah (1857–1858). During his reign, Daik found unprecedented prosperity. The Sultan improved the local economy by encouraging rice cultivation and opium preparation. He also possessed a small armada to promote trade relations. He introduced sago from the Moluccas to the local people, which he believed was a better crop than rice as a staple food, as rice can be only harvested once yearly. Daik then become a regional trade centre attracting traders from China, Celebes, Borneo, the Malay Peninsula, Sumatra, Pagaruyung, Java, Siak and Pahang.

This caused the Dutch concern, as they feared that the sultanate might gather enough supplies and forces to defeat them. Due to this fear, the Dutch appointed an assistant resident to be stationed in Tanjung Buton, a port close to Mepar Island, 6 kilometres from the Riau administrative centre.

=== The rise of nationalism ===
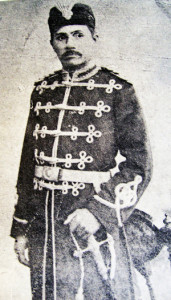
Ali Kelana, Crown Prince of Riau-Lingga, one of the founding fathers of the Roesidijah Club Riouw, the first modern organisation in the Netherlands East Indies. (taken in 1899)

The globalisation of the 19th century opened new opportunities for the Riau-Lingga Sultanate. Proximity to cosmopolitan Singapore, just 40 miles away, shaped the political climate of the kingdom, giving Riau Malays an opportunity to familiarise themselves with new ideas from the Middle East. The opening of Suez Canal meant a journey to Mecca via Port Said, Egypt and Singapore could take no more than a fortnight; thus these cities became major ports for the Hajj pilgrimage.

Inspired by the experience and intellectual progress attained in the Middle East and influenced by the Pan-Islamism brotherhood, the Riau Malay intelligentsia established the Roesidijah (Club) Riouw in 1895. The association was born as a literary circle to develop the religious, cultural and intellectual needs of the sultanate, but as it matured, it changed into a more critical organisation and began to address the fight against Dutch rule in the kingdom.

The era was marked by growing awareness among the elite and rulers of the importance of watan (homeland) and one's duty towards his or her native soil. In order to succeed to establish a watan, the land must be independent and sovereign, a far-cry from a Dutch-controlled sultanate. Moreover, it was also viewed that the penetration of the west in the state was slowly tearing apart the fabric of the Malay-Muslim identity.

By the dawn of the 20th century, the association had become a political tool for rising against the colonial power, with Raja Muhammad Thahir and Raja Ali Kelana acting as its backbone. Diplomatic missions were sent to the Ottoman Empire in 1883, 1895 and in 1905 to secure the liberation of the kingdom by Raja Ali Kelana, accompanied by a renowned Pattani-born Ulema, Syeikh Wan Ahmad Fatani. The Dutch Colonial Office in Tanjung Pinang labelled the organisation as a versetpartai (Dutch: Left-leaning party). The organisation also won momentous support from the Mohakamah (Malay Judiciary) and the Dewan Kerajaan (Sultanate Administrative Board). It critically monitored and researched every step taken by the Dutch Colonial Resident in the sultanate's administration, which led to Dutch outrage.

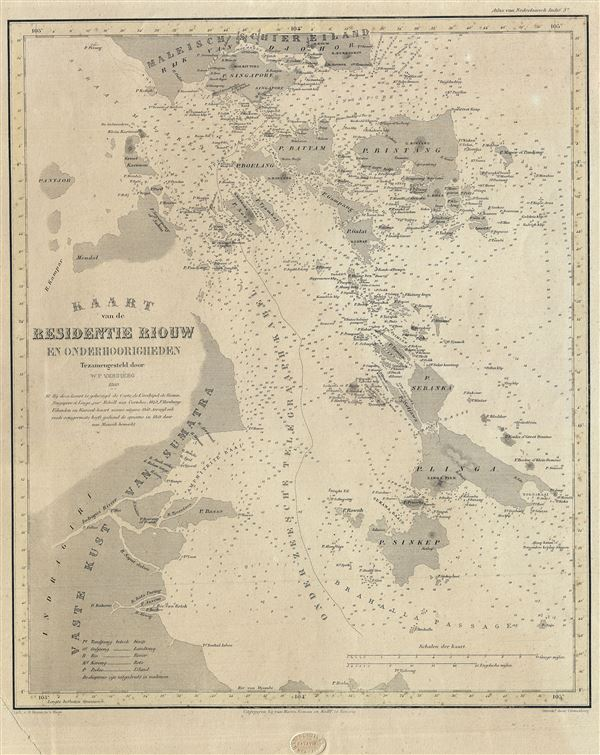
A Dutch map of Residentie Riouw en Onderhoorigheden (Residence of Riau and Dependencies) in 1860.

The movement was an early form of Malay nationalism. Non-violence and passive resistance measures were adopted by the association. The main method of the movement was to hold symbolic boycotts. The Dutch then branded the movement as leidelek verset (Dutch: Passive resistance), and passive acts such as ignoring the raising of the Dutch flag were met with anger by the Batavia-based Raad van Indie (Dutch East Indies Council) and the Advisor on Native Affairs, Christiaan Snouck Hurgronje. In a geheim (Dutch: secret) letter 660/G, dated 7 May 1904 to the Dutch East Indies Council, Hurgronje advocated that the sultanate and association be crushed as resistance in the earlier Aceh War had been. Hurgronje justified this with several arguments, among which were that since 1902 the members of the Roesidijah Klub would gather around the royal court and refuse to raise the Dutch flag on government vessels. The Dutch Colonial Resident in Riau, A.L. Van Hasselt advised the Governor of Netherlands East Indies that the Sultan was an opponent to the Dutch and immersed with a group of hardcore verzetparty. Later, on 1 January 1903, the Dutch Colonial Resident found that the Dutch flag was not being raised during his visit to the royal palace. In his report to the governor he wrote; "it seems that he (Sultan Abdul Rahman II) acted as if he was a sovereign king and he raises his own flag". Based on several records in the Indonesian National Archive, there were some reports that the Sultan then apologised to the governor over the "flag incident".

In its reply to the geheim letter numbered 1036/G 9 August 1904, the Dutch East Indies Council agreed on the proposal put forward by Hurgronje and authorised action against the nationalist association. Nonetheless, advice to the Sultan was to be first to put forward a military action towards the kingdom and association. The council also advised the Dutch Resident in Riau to avoid entering contractual agreement before achieving consensus with the ruling elite of the Riau-Lingga Sultanate.

=== Dissolution by the Dutch ===
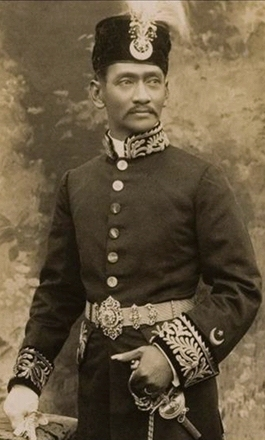
The last Sultan of Riau-Lingga, Abdul Rahman II. He was forced to live in exile after his refusal to sign an agreement with the Dutch that was intended to totally limit his powers.

On 18 May 1905, the Dutch demanded a new agreement with the sultan, stipulating further limits on the powers of the Riau-Lingga Sultanate, requiring that the Dutch flag must be raised higher than the flag of Riau, and specifying that Dutch officials should be given supreme honour in the land. The agreement further stipulated that the Riau-Lingga Sultanate was a mere achazat (Dutch: loan) from the Dutch Government. The agreement was drawn up due to the fact that the appointment of Sultan Abdul Rahman II (1885–1911) had not been made with the consent of the Dutch and he was also clearly against colonial rule.

The Dutch insisted that the sultan sign the agreement, but after consulting the fellow rulers of the state, Engku Kelana, Raja Ali, Raja Hitam and other members of the ruling elite, he refused, and decided to form a military regiment under the leadership of the prince regent, Tengku Umar. During a visit of the Dutch Resident's visit to Penyengat, the sultan then, on his own authority and without Dutch approval, summoned the rulers of Reteh, Gaung and Mandah, making the Resident feel as if he was being besieged by the sultanate. The affiliates of the Roesidijah Klub, mainly the members of the administrative class, were thus able to slowly manoeuvre Abdul Rahman, once a supporter of Dutch rule, to act against the colonial power's wishes.

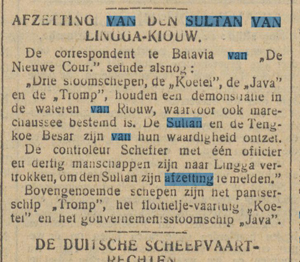
The dissolution of the sultanate as reported in Rotterdam's Nieuwe Rotterdamsche Courant on 19 February 1911.

The bold resolution shown by the sultan and fellow officials was not welcomed by the Dutch. According to the journal kept by the Syahbandar (Harbourmaster), the decision of the sultan was deplored by the Dutch Resident, G.F Bruijn Kops who stated "they molded the sultan to retaliate (against the Dutch), so a retaliation (by the Dutch) shall be administered".

On the morning of 11 February 1911, when the sultan and the court officials were in Daik to perform the Mandi Safar (a ritual purifying bath), Dutch Naval ships of Java, Tromp and Koetai Torpedo Boat anchored in Penyengat Island and deployed hundreds of pribumi soldiers (Dutch: marechausse) to lay siege to the royal court. This was followed by the arrival of Dutch official K.M Voematra from Tanjung Pinang at the Roesidijah Club headquarters to announce the deposition of Abdul Rahman II. Once the letter of deposition had been read by the Dutch official, he described the crown prince and other members of the Roesidijah Klub as "individuals who harbour animosity against his excellency the Governor of Netherlands Indies" (orang berniat bermusuhan dengan Sri Padoeka Gouvenrnement Hindia Nederland).

The Dutch then seized the official coronation regalia, and to prevent their seizure by the Dutch, many official buildings were deliberately razed by members of the court themselves. A mass exodus of civilians and officials to Johor and Singapore then took place. To avoid violence and the death of civilians in Pulau Penyengat, the sultan and his officials decided not to fight the Dutch troops. The sultan and Tengku Ampuan (the Queen) left Pulau Penyengat and sailed to Singapore in the royal vessel Sri Daik, while Crown Prince Raja Ali Kelana, Khalid Hitam and the resistance movement in Bukit Bahjah followed a couple of days later. The deposed Abdul Rahman II was forced to live in exile in Singapore.

=== Aftermath ===
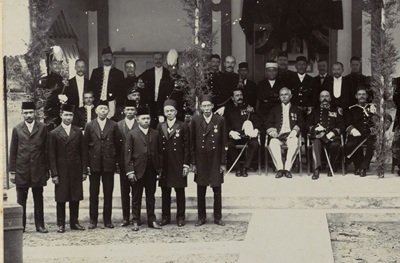
The Datuk Kaya or local Malay rulers of Poelau Toedjoeh (Tudjuh Archipelago) with G.F Bruijn Kops, the Dutch Resident of Riouw. Taken in Tanjung Pinang, a week after the abdication of the Sultan (1911).

The Dutch officially annexed the sultanate to avoid future claims from the monarchy. Rechtstreeks bestuur (Dutch: Direct rule) over the Riau Archipelago began in 1913, and the province was administered as Residentie Riouw en Onderhoorigheden (Dutch: Residence of Riau and Dependencies). The Dutch Residence comprised Tanjung Pinang, Lingga, Riau and Indragiri, while the Tudjuh Archipelago was administered separately as "Afdeeling Poelau-Toedjoeh" (Dutch: The Division of Pulau Tudjuh).

The sultan appealed to the British administration for aid, but although he was given refuge and protection in Singapore, the British were reluctant to interfere. Diplomatic missions were sent to the Empire of Japan by Raja Khalid Hitam in 1911 and to the Ottoman Empire by Raja Ali Kelana in 1913 to call for the restoration of the sultanate. At one point the sultan even wanted to abdicate in favour of his son, Tengku Besar, as these diplomatic initiatives seemed to be in vain. The sultan died in Singapore in 1930. Several members of the royal family later asserted their claim to be recognised as the sultan.

=== Restoration attempts and the Dewan Riow ===
When World War II broke out, the Dutch were initially reluctant to defend issues within their territories in the East Indies. This led the British to consider creating a buffer state in Riau. They discussed prospects for a restoration with Tengku Omar and Tengku Besar, descendants of the sultans, who were then based in Terengganu. However, as the war approached Southeast Asia, the Dutch actively engaged in the defensive system alongside the British, and the British decided to shelve the restoration plan.

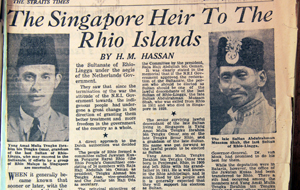
The Straits Times, dated 11 December 1947 on the establishment of Riouw Raad, with Tengku Ibrahim (left) to be crowned as the sultan if the sultanate were to be revived. Seen in right was his grandfather, the late Sultan Abdul Rahman II.

In the aftermath of the war and the struggle against Dutch rule, several exile associations collectively known as the Gerakan Kesultanan Riau (Riau Sultanate Movement) emerged in Singapore, planning for a restoration. Some of the groups dated from as early as the dissolution of the sultanate, but started to gain momentum following the post-world war confusion and politics. From the ashes of political uncertainty and fragility in the East Indies following the World War II, a royalist faction known as Persatoean Melayu Riouw Sedjati (PMRS) (Association of the Indigenous Riau Malays) emerged to call for the restoration of the Riau-Lingga Sultanate. The council was financially backed by rich Riau Malay émigrés and Chinese merchants who hoped to obtain tin concession. Initially founded in High Street, Singapore, the association moved to Tanjung Pinang, Riau with the unprecedented approval by the Dutch administrators. Based in Tanjung Pinang, the group managed to gain the consent of the Dutch for self-governance in the region with the foundation of the Dewan Riouw (Dutch: Riouw Raad, English: Riouw Council). The Riouw Raad was the devolved national unicameral legislature of Riau, a position equivalent to a Parliament.

After establishing itself in Tanjung Pinang, the group formed a new organisation known as Djawatan Koewasa Pengoeroes Rakjat Riow (The Council of Riau People Administration), with the members hailing from Tudjuh Archipelago, Great Karimun, Lingga and Singkep. This group strongly advocated the restoration of the Riau-Lingga Sultanate after the status of Indonesia became official. The leader of the council, Raja Abdullah, claimed that Riau Malays were neglected at the expense of the non-Riau Indonesians who dominated the upper ranks of the Riau civil administration. By restoring the monarch, they believed the position of Riau Malays would be guarded.

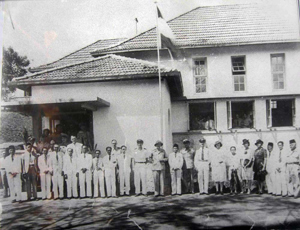
The Riouw Raad building with Encik Mohamad Apan (middle, don under a peci) the temporary leader of the council, with other members of the Riouw Raad during the appointment of the Provincial Resident on 4 August 1947.

The royalist association met with resistance from the republican group led by Dr. Iljas Datuk Batuah that sent delegates to Singapore to counter the propaganda of sultanate supporters. Based on Indonesian archive records, Dr. Iljas gained approvals from non-Malay newcomers to Riau, including Minang, Javanese, Palembang, and Batak people. He later formed a group known as the Badan Kedaulatan Indonesia Riouw (BKRI) (Indonesian Riau Sovereignty Bureau) on 8 October 1945. The organisation sought to absorb the Riau Archipelago into the then-newly independent Indonesia, as the archipelago was still retained by the Dutch. BKRI hoped that the new republican administration under Sukarno would give the pribumis a fair chance to run the local government.

The royalist association would not give any public support to the Indonesian movement, as is evident in its refusal to display the Bendera Merah-Putih (Indonesian Flag) during the Indonesian Independence Day celebration on 17 August 1947 in Singapore. This led republicans to call the royalists 'pro-Dutch'. The royalists however, maintained that Riau was a Dutch territory and that only the Dutch could support it.

The flag of Federasi Bangka Belitung dan Riau (Bangka Belitung and Riau Federation), an autonomous territory under Dutch rule in United States of Indonesia until 1950.

The Dutch countered the claims of the BKRI by granting autonomous rule to the Riau Council, in which links with the Dutch would be maintained while a restored sultanate would play a secondary role. The council, created following the decree of the Governor General of the East Indies on 12 July 1947, was inaugurated on 4 August 1947, and represented a major step forward in the revival of the monarchy system. Several key members of the PMRS were elected to the Riau Council alongside their BKRI rivals, the Chinese kapitans from Tanjung Pinang and Pulau Tujuh, local Malay leaders of Lingga and Dutch officials in Tanjung Pinang. On 23 January 1948, the states of the Bangka Council, the Belitung Council, and the Riau Council merged to form the Bangka Belitung and Riau Federation, which in the following year was admitted as part of the United States of Indonesia.

The call for revival of the sultanate continued throughout the period of autonomous rule under the Riau Council, although the influence of republicanism also continued to strengthen thru the BKRI delegation in the council, which was the opposition. The appeal of revival began to subside following the dissolution of the Bangka Belitung and Riau Federation on 4 April 1950. After the official withdrawal by the Dutch in 1950, the Riau Archipelago became Keresidenan Riau under Central Sumatra Province following official merger by the United States of Indonesia. Being one of the last territories merged into Indonesia, Riau was known as the daerah-daerah pulihan (recovered regions), and the Riau area became a province in August 1957 - the Dewan Riau recreated by then under the Republic as the Riau Provincial People's Representative Council (DPRD-Provinsi Riau), the provincial legislative assembly, to serve both the islands and the mainland territories. In 2002, the offshore islands of the Riau Archipelago, the territory of the former sultanate, became a separate province, Riau Islands, with its own provincial authorities and legislative, the latter a modern incarnation of the Riau Council.

The leader of Riau forces, Major Raja Muhammad Yunus, who led the bid to reestablish the sultanate apart from Indonesia fled into exile in Johor after his ill attempt. The geopolitical roots of the Riau Archipelago had molded her nationalist position to be sandwiched between the kindred monarchist Peninsular Malay Nationalism observed across the border in British Malaya with the pro-republic and pan-ethnic Indonesian Nationalism manifested in her own Dutch East Indies domain.

== Government ==
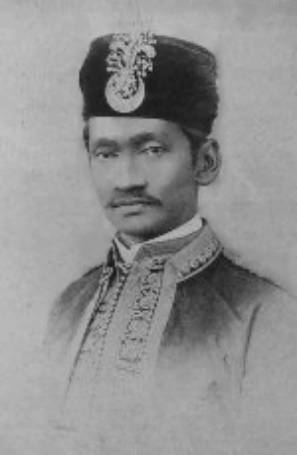
A picture Sultan Abdul Rahman II (1890–1911) shows him with a headdress with a crescent and five-pointed star from which a lily-shaped ornament rises. The crescent and star symbolise "Head of State" as the crescent is the Islamic emblem of state, and the star the emblem of a (Muslim) ruler.

The Riau Sultanate had an unusual division of authority at its heart. The Sultan, who was a Malay, acted as Head of State while the Dipertuan Muda/Yamtuan Muda (deputy ruler or Viceroy), a position held by the Bugis ruling elite, served as the Head of Government. (Following the partition of Johor-Riau, the position of Yang di-Pertuan was retained only in the Riau-Lingga Sultanate and not in Johor).

The sultan's royal palace was located in Penyengat Inderasakti and the Yang di-Pertuan Muda resided in Daik, Lingga. The Sultan was dominant in Lingga and its dependencies, while the Bugis Yang di-Pertuan Muda controlled Riau (consisting of Bintan, Penyengat and the surrounding islands), with each of them having no claim on the revenues of the other. These spheres of control would only begin to erode during the time of Yang di-Pertuan Muda Yusuf Ahmadi.

Riau later became the heart of Bugis political influence in the western Malay World. However, the power division between the Malay and the Bugis was not met without any major dispute between the two houses.

=== Adat ===
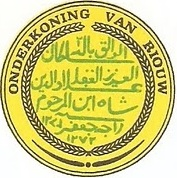
Onderkoning Van Riau (Dutch: Viceroy of Riau) inscribed on the mohor (royal seal) of Yang di-Pertuan Muda Abdullah, the XI Yang di-Pertuan Muda of Riau Lingga (1857–8). In a fusion of Arabic-Malay written in Jawi script the seal also bears the inscription Al Watik Baladun Al Aziz Al Ghaffar Sultan Alauddin Syah Ibni Al Marhum Raja Jaafar 1273-Hijrah (lit: the trusted governor, the powerful, the protector, Sultan Alauddin Syah Ibni Al Marhum Raja Jaafar, Year 1273 AH (1856AD)

The adat istiadat (custom) called for a separation of powers and an oath of allegiance called Persetiaan Sungai Baru (The Oath of Sungai Baru) sworn between the Bugis and the Malays and renewed for five times between 1722 and 1858. Under the adat, only Malays could be Sultan and the position of the Yang di-Pertuan Muda was reserved exclusively to the Bugis.

The traditional system was retained until the appointment of Abdul Rahman II, the last sultan of Riau-Lingga. Abdul Rahman's father, Raja Muhammad Yusuf, was a Bugis aristocrat and the 10th and the last Yang di-Pertuan Muda of Riau. He was married to Tengku Fatimah, the daughter of Sultan Mahmud and the only full-blooded member of the Malay royalty.

On 17 September 1883, in wake of the death of Badrul Alam Syah II, the Bugis-Malay elites voted for Tengku Fatimah as his successor, making her the first queen regnant in the history of the empire since the Malaccan period. Nearly a month later, on 13 October, another gathering was convened, and on this occasion Abdul Rahman II, was crowned as the new sultan after Tengku Fatimah voluntarily abdicated in favour of her son.

Unusually, because of his parentage, Abdul Rahman II was both sultan and first in line of succession to the Yang di-Pertuan Muda position as well. 1895 was the last occasion the pledge of allegiance was sworn, in this instance between the sultan and his father, the last Yang di-Pertuan Muda. His father later renounced his position as the Yang di-Pertuan Muda and thereafter both roles were combined, symbolising of unity between the Bugis and the Malay dynasties.

The pledge of allegiance included the following words:

Jawi script

...جكالاو توان كڤد بوڬيس
توانله كڤد ملايو
دان جكالاو توان كڤد ملايو
توانله كڤد بوڬيس

دان جكالاو موسوه كڤد بوڬيس
موسوهله كڤد ملايو
دان جكالاو موسوه كڤد ملايو
موسوهله كڤد بوڬيس

مك بارڠسياڤا موڠكير

دبينساكن الله سمڤأي انق چوچوڽ..."
Rumi script

...jikalau tuan kepada Bugis,
tuanlah kepada Melayu
dan jikalau tuan kepada Melayu
tuanlah kepada Bugis

dan jikalau musuh kepada Bugis
musuhlah kepada Melayu
dan jikalau musuh kepada Melayu
musuhlah kepada Bugis

maka barangsiapa mungkir
dibinasakan Allah sampai anak cucunya...

English translation

"... if he was an ally to the Bugis
he shall then be an ally to the Malays
and if he was an ally to the Malays
he shall then be an ally to the Bugis

and if he was a nemesis to the Bugis
he shall then be a nemesis to the Malays
and if he was a nemesis to the Malays
he shall then be a nemesis to the Bugis

if one ever betrayed
calamity by Allah till his descendants..."

=== Yang di-Pertuan Muda ===
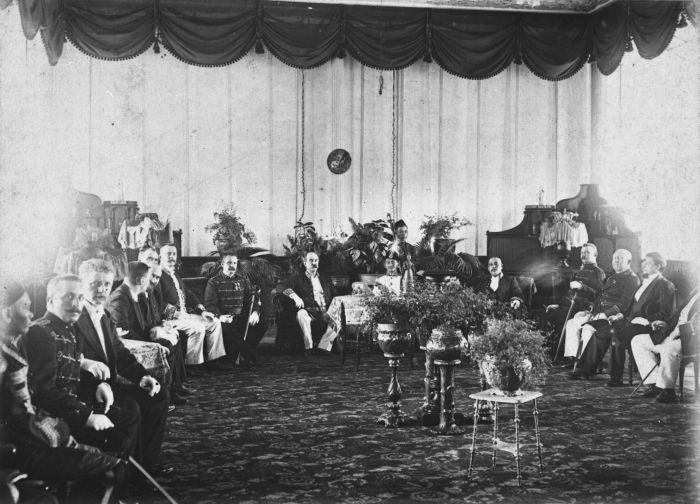
The Dutch Resident with the Sultan. (1890–1910)

The viceregal house of Riau claimed to trace their ancestry from the Bugis Royal House in Luwu, Celebes. The Bugis prominence in the region began during the reign of Abdu'l-Jalil Rahmat of Johor-Riau, during the period of turbulence the Sultan was killed by Raja Kecil who claimed that he was an offspring of the late Sultan Mahmud. He later descent as the Sultan of old Johor. The death of Abdul Jalil was witnessed by his son, Sulaiman of Johor-Riau, who later then requested aid from the Bugis of Klang to combat Raja Kecil and his troops. The alliance formed between Sulaiman and the Bugis managed to defeat Raja Kecil off from his throne.

As the settlement for the debt of honour by Sulaiman of Johor-Riau in 1772, a joint government were structured between the Bugis forces and the nascent community and the native Malays and several political marriage were formed between the two dynasties. The Bugis chieftain was formally rewarded for his service with the titles of Yang di-Pertuan Muda/Yamtuan Muda (deputy ruler or Viceroy) and Raja Tua (principal prince), receiving the second and third paramount seat in the sultanate. Although the latter title became obsolete, the position of Yang Dipertuan Muda dominated until the reformation that merged the sovereignty of the two Royal houses in 1899.

The Yang di-Pertuan Muda possessed a de facto prerogative powers exceeding that of the sultan himself. Despite the fact his function under the law was second highest in the office, nonetheless in practice he can over-rule the sultan. This was strongly evident during the rule of Sultan Abdul Rahman II when Yang di-Pertuan Muda Raja Ja'afar was perceived to be dominant when he acted as the regent of the sultanate. Yang di-Pertuan Muda Raja Ja'afar was the one high official responsible for the crowning of Abdul Rahman and highly influential during the negotiation with the Dutch and English governments during the succession dispute between Tengku Hussein and Tengku Abdul Rahman.

=== Resident ===
For the hereditary position of the Sultan, the sultan was fully subjected under the influence of the Dutch East Indies authority. Albeit he is de jure on the apex of the monarchy system, he is under the direct control of the Dutch Resident in Tanjung Pinang. All matters pertaining the administration of the sultanate including the appointment of the Sultan and the Yang di-Pertuan Muda, must be made within the knowledge and even the consent of the Dutch Resident.

== List of office bearers ==
=== Sultans of Riau-Lingga ===
| Sultans of Riau-Lingga | Reign |
|---|---|
House of Bendahara
| Abdul Rahman Muazzam Shah | 1818–1832 |
| Muhammad II Muazzam Shah | 1832–1842 |
| Mahmud IV Muzaffar Shah | 1842–1857 |
| Sulaiman Badrul Alam Shah II | 1857–1883 |
House of Yang di-Pertuan Muda
| Abdul Rahman II Muazzam Shah | 1883–1911 |

=== Yang di-Pertuan Muda of Riau ===
| Yang di-Pertuan Muda of Riau (House of Yang di-Pertuan Muda) | In office |
|---|---|
| Daeng Marewah | 1722–1728 |
| Daeng Chelak | 1728–1745 |
| Daeng Kemboja | 1745–1777 |
| Raja Haji | 1777–1784 |
| Raja Ali | 1784–1805 |
| Raja Ja'afar | 1805–1831 |
| Raja Abdul Rahman | 1831–1844 |
| Raja Ali bin Raja Jaafar | 1844–1857 |
| Raja Haji Abdullah | 1857–1858 |
| Raja Muhammad Yusuf | 1858–1899 |

== Gallery ==
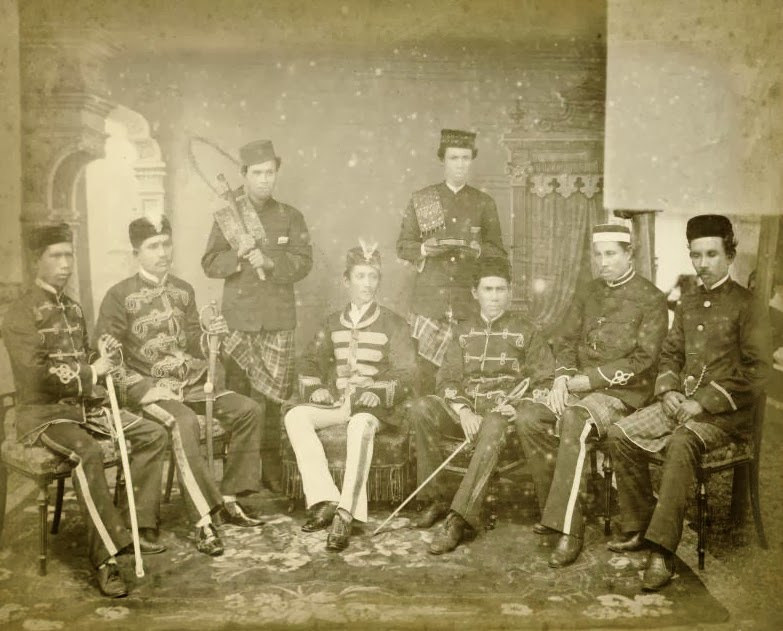
Abdul Rahman II with fellow rulers (c. 1880)

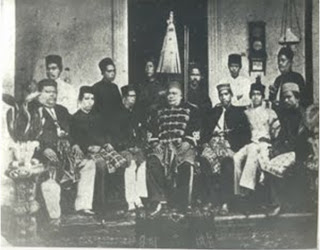
Muhammad Yusof, the 10th Yang Dipertuan Muda of Riau-Lingga (taken circa 1858–1899)

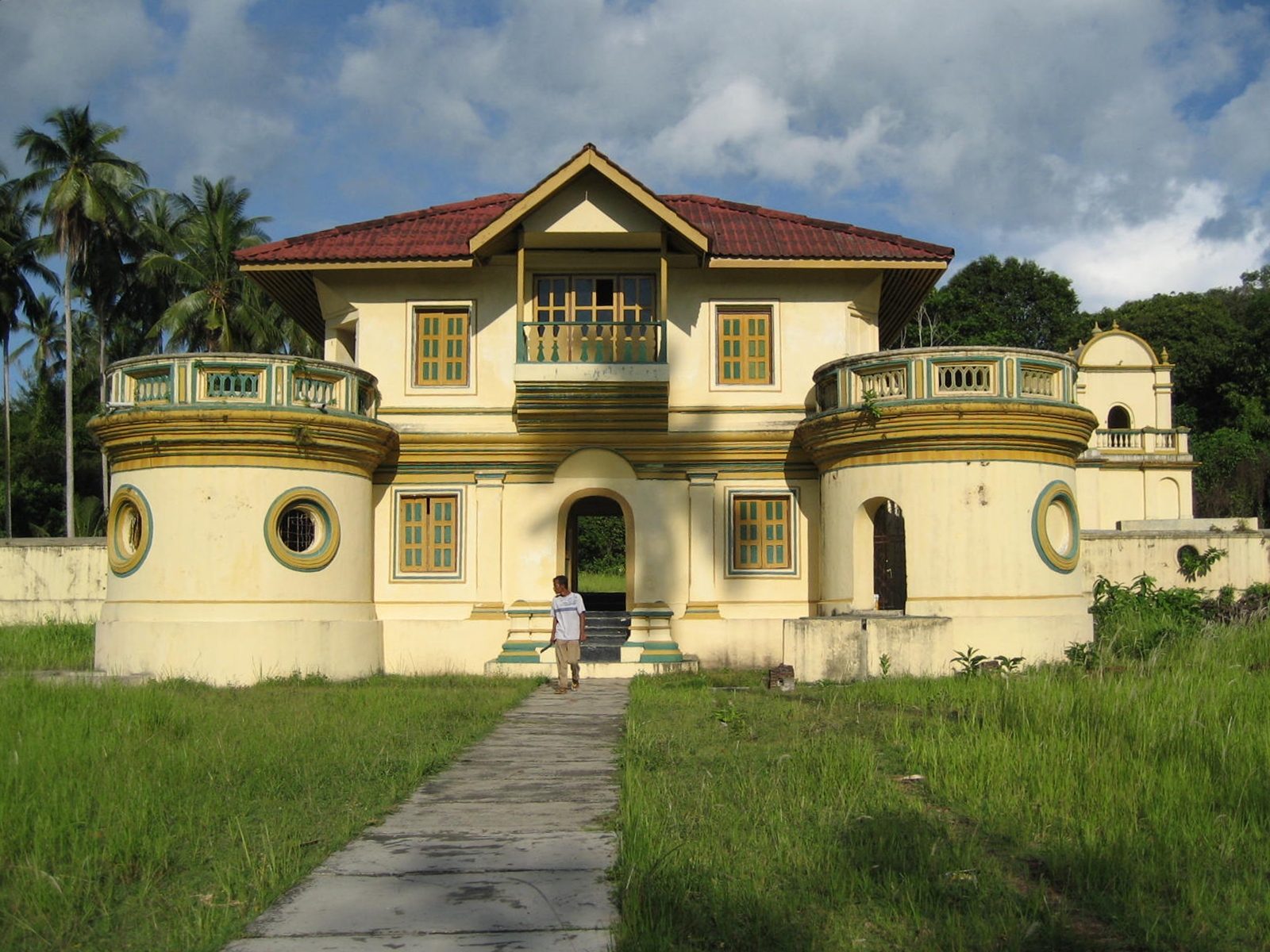
The remains of Istana Kantor, built in 1844, was the first administration and residential complex of the Yang Dipertuan Muda dynasty

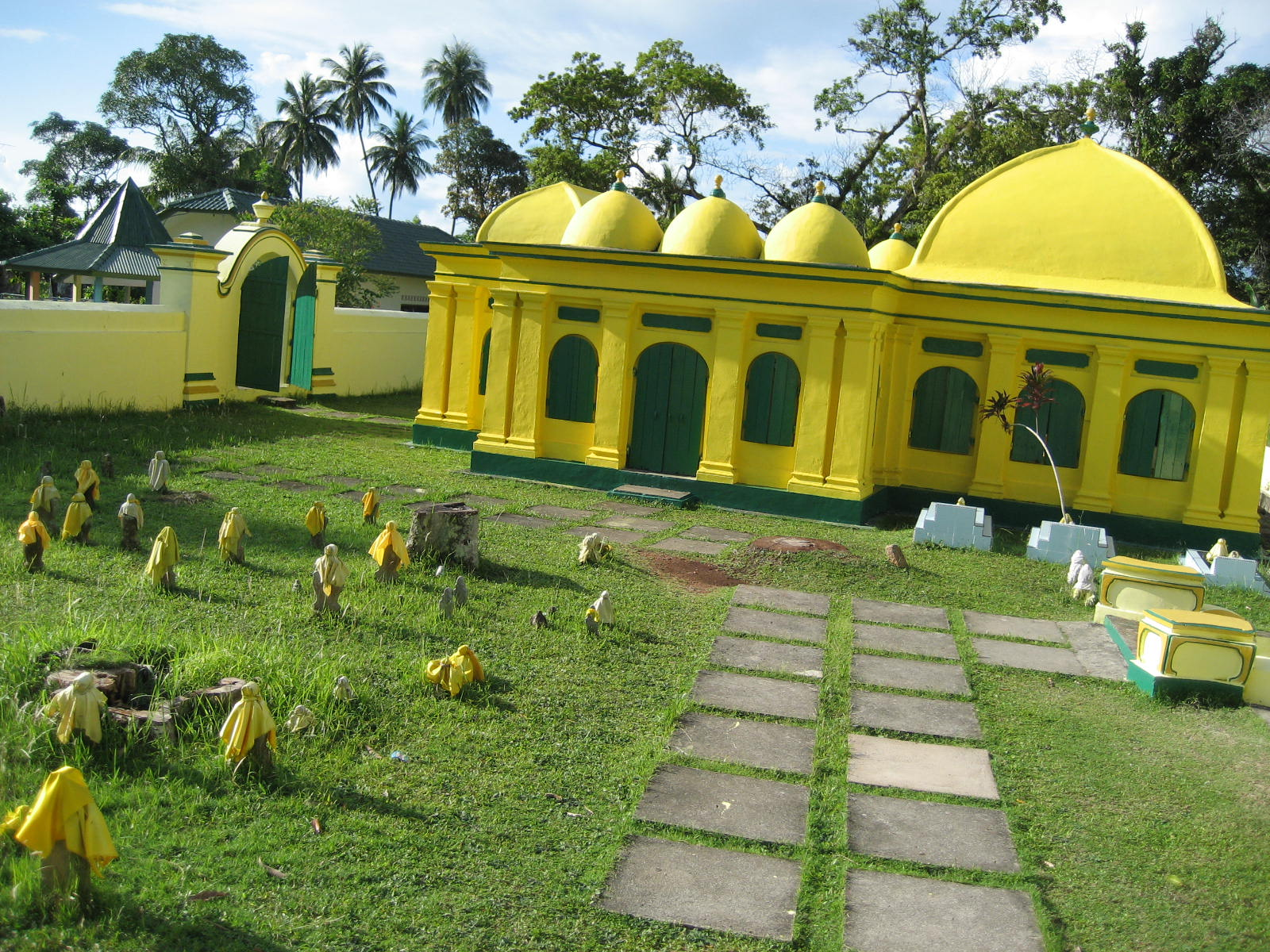
The Royal Mausoleum in Penyengat Inderasakti

== Family Tree ==
Family Tree of Riau-Lingga Rulers

Daeng Parani | Daeng Marewah; YDPM of Riau^{(1)} r. 1722-1728 | Daeng Chelak; YDPM of Riau^{(2)} r. 1728-1745
Daeng Kemboja; YDPM of Riau^{(3)} r. 1745-1777 | Raja Haji; Fisabilillah; YDPM of Riau^{(4)} r. 1777-1784 | Abdul Rahman; Muazzam; Shah I^{(1)} r. 1811-1832
Raja Ali; YDPM of Riau^{(5)} r. 1784-1806 | Raja Ja'afar; YDPM of Riau^{(6)} r. 1806-1831 | Muhammad; Muazzam; Shah II^{(2)} r. 1832-1841 | Sulaiman; Badrul Alam; Shah II^{(4)} r. 1857-1883
Raja; Abdul Rahman; YDPM of Riau^{(7)} r. 1831-1844 | Raja Ali; YDPM of Riau^{(8)} r. 1844-1857 | Raja Haji; Abdullah; YDPM of Riau^{(9)} r. 1857-1858 | Mahmud; Muzaffar; Shah IV^{(3)} r. 1841-1857
Raja; Muhammad; Yusuf; YDPM of Riau^{(10)} r. 1858-1899 | ♀ Tengku; Embung; Fatima
Abdul Rahman; Muazzam; Shah II^{(5)} r. 1883-1911

== National symbol ==
=== Flags of the Riau-Lingga Sultanate ===
The earlier flag of Riau Sultanate was established on 26 November 1818. It was provided in section 11 of the Royal decree that the flag of the Sultanate of Riau should be black with a white canton. The similar flag design was also adopted by its sister state of Johor.

Flag of the Riau-Lingga Sultanate in 1818.

Personal standard of the Sultan

Personal Standard of the Yang Dipertuan Muda (Viceregal)

Personal standard of the Pangeran Laksamana (Chief Admiral)

Royal Standard
Male Royal Standard

Royal Ensign

Yang Dipertuan Muda Ensign

Naval Ensign

Civil Ensign

== Royal and noble ranks ==
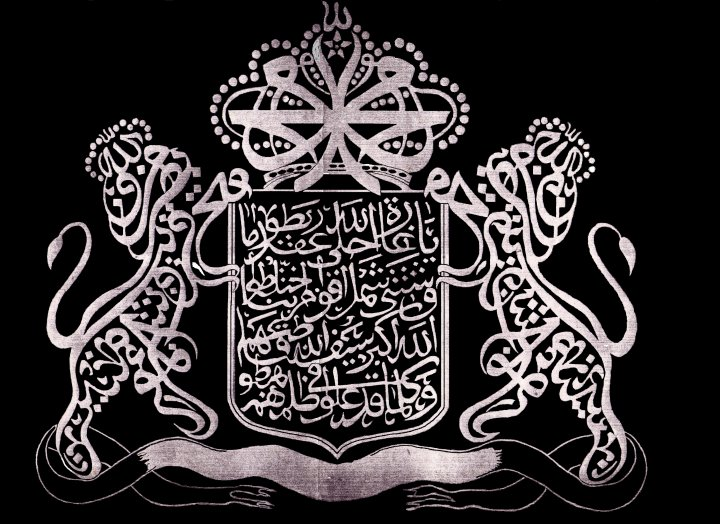
The Heraldic badge of Riau-Lingga Sultanate in Arabic calligraphy, consisting of a Dua and verses from the As-Saff surah.

=== Royal family ===
- Sultan: The reigning prince was styled the Sultan (personal reign name) ibni al-Marhum (father's title and personal name), Sultan of Riau, Lingga and dependencies, with the style of His Highness.
- Tengku Ampuan: The senior consort of the ruling prince.
- Tengku Besar: The Heir Apparent.
- Tengku Besar Perempuan: The consort of the Heir Apparent.
- Tengku Muda: The Heir Presumptive
- Tengku Muda Perempuan: The consort of the Heir Presumptive.
- Tengku: The other sons, daughters and descendants of Sultans, in the male line: They would be styled as Tengku (personal name) ibni al-Marhum (father's title and personal name).

=== Yang di-Pertuan Muda ===
- Yang di-Pertuan Muda: The ruling prince of Riau, with the style of His Highness. In earlier days, the ruling prince also received the personal title of Sultan and a reign name.
- Raja Muda: The Heir Apparent, styled as Raja (personal name) bin Raja (father's name), Raja Muda.
- Raja: The sons, daughters, grandchildren's and other descendants of the ruling prince, in the male line: Raja (personal name) bin Raja (father's name).

== Territory ==
Following the partition of Johor and the relinquishing of rights over the Malay Peninsula, the sultanate was effectively a maritime state. The Riau Sultanate's dominions encompassed the Riau, Lingga and Tudjuh Archipelago, including Batam, Rempang, Galang, Bintan, Combol, Kundur, Karimun, Bunguran, Lingga, Singkep, Badas, Tambelan, Natuna, Anambas and many smaller islands. There were also several territories in Igal, Gaung, Reteh and Mandah located in Indragiri on mainland Sumatra. All these territories were headed by a Datuk Kaya (nobleman), known as an Amir (equivalent to a Prince or Duke) who had been chosen by the sultan or by the ruling elite to deal with the local administration.

== Foreign relations and trade ==
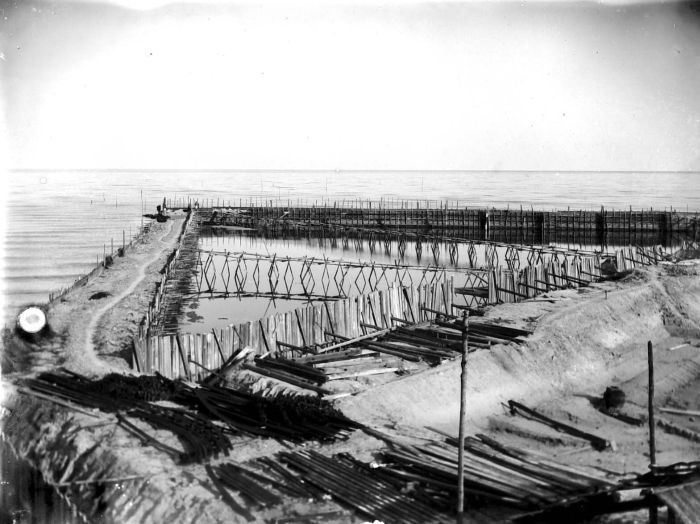
A tin mine belonging to the Sultan in Singkep.

There were two main economic and commercial sources of wealth in Riau-Lingga, spices (especially peppers) and tin. The Dutch monopolised the trade system in the Riau archipelago even before the partition of 1824, and were keen to control the region after gaining influence following the Dutch-Johor-Riau agreement.

=== Dutch ===
One of the most prominent battles during the Riau-Dutch wars was between Raja Haji and the Dutch militia. The fight against the Dutch, led by Raja Haji in Tanjung Pinang, managed to prevent the Dutch force from advancing on Malacca. In June 1784, Raja Haji was killed in Teluk Ketapang and was posthumously known was "Marhum Teluk Ketapang". After his death, in November 1784, the Dutch entered into an agreement with Mahmud Syah of the Johor-Riau Sultanate. The agreement contained 14 clauses which proved to be detrimental to the Johor-Riau Sultanate. For instance, the Dutch were free to engage in commerce in the kingdom and were permitted to open their own trade post in Tanjung Pinang. Every passing ship in the region had to obtain consent from the Dutch and only the Dutch could bring the ores and spices.

=== British ===
Dutch dominance began to wane when the Dutch East India Company went bankrupt in 1799. The British influence then started to supersede the Dutch in the region. In contrast to the Dutch, the British followed a more moderate approach in engaging with the Johor-Riau Empire. Apart from controlling Malacca in 1795, the British recognised the Johor-Riau Sultanate as a sovereign state. The British were free to engage in commercial activities with the Riau traders without any major economic burden on them. The commercial ties between the Johor-Riau sultanate and the British were initially secret before being disclosed openly later on.

=== Ottomans ===
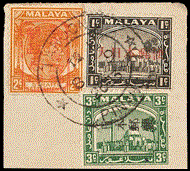
Japanese stamps issued in Tandjoengpinang, Riow in 1943. The territory was occupied by Imperial Japan during World War II, with its territorial jurisdiction incorporated into Malaya.

Observing the rise of the Islamic Brotherhood that gained momentum in the late 18th century, the Riau-Lingga Sultanate regarded the Ottoman Empire as a protector against non-Muslim colonial powers. In the eyes of the ruling elite of the court, the Ottomans were a source of inspiration and a balancing power between the western powers and Islamic world. The Crimean War fought by the Ottomans was regarded as a struggle of a "Muslim power" against the "Foreigners", Christians, which to a degree corresponded with the struggle faced in Riau-Lingga.

The status of the Aceh Sultanate as a vassal of the Ottomans, provided a vital precedent for the Riau-Lingga following the deteriorating relationship with the Dutch. The court discussed a possibility to receiving the same status and protection under the Ottomans with the Ottoman consulate-general in Batavia in 1897–1899 Muhammad Kamil Bey. A diplomatic mission embarked in October 1904 under Raja Ali Kelana with the necessary documents, letter and treaties. Nevertheless, in view of the weakening domestic situation in the Ottoman Empire, the Riau case failed to gain any interest by the Ottomans.

=== Japan ===
The meteoric rise of Japan as a global superpower in the 19th century was also viewed with awe and hope by the Riau people. Following the demise of the sultanate in 1911, the officials of Riau began to seek help for the restoration of the sultanate - this was part of the Pan-Asianism movement against the Europeans. In October 1912, a letter requesting an intervention from the Japanese Emperor was sent. The deposed Sultan Abdul Rahman sought to become a Japanese vassal state following restoration of the sultanate. Raja Khalid Hitam was then delegated to lead a diplomatic mission. Upon his arrival in Tokyo, he resided temporarily with Encik Ahmad, a Penyengat-born Malay academic who taught at the Tokyo School of Foreign Languages. However, after his arrival, the Dutch Consul-General in Tokyo left the country and travelled to Singapore, resulting in the failure of the mission.

A second diplomatic mission was sent in June 1914, but this also failed. The health of Raja Khalid Hitam was deteriorating, and he died after a brief hospitalisation in Japan.

== Society ==
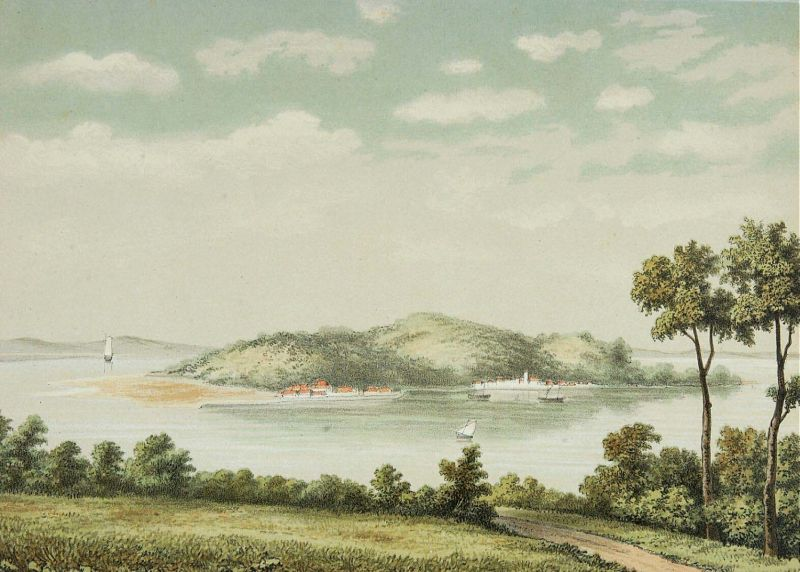
Pulau Penyengat (lit: Wasp island), lithography of an original watercolour by J.C. Rappard. c. 1883–1889. Initially founded as a royal dowry for Engku Puteri Hamidah, by the late 19th century, it was known as Penyengat Inderasakti. The latter was derived from Indera (Royal) and Sakti (Divination).

The opening of stannary towns in Karimun, Kundur and Singkep by 1801 proved brought prosperity to the Riau Islands. During this time Pulau Penyengat was established as a royal settlement in 1804. It was initially founded as a royal dowry for Engku Puteri, a Johor-Riau aristocrat of Bugis lineage who returned to the island from the Mempawah Sultanate in western Borneo. She became the fourth wife of Sultan Mahmud Syah and Queen Consort of the Johor-Riau Sultanate.

Penyengat was later developed as the seat for the Yang di-Pertuan Muda. A palace, balai (audience hall), mosque and fortification were constructed on the island, presumably to resolve the dispute between the Malays and the Bugis. He expressly bequeathed the island to Raja Hamidah and the descendants of Raja Haji (her late father who previously won the war against the Dutch). The sultan then separated his kingdom into Malay and Bugis spheres. He decided that the Bugis Yang di-Pertuan Muda would govern Riau (the islands of Bintan, Penyengat and their dependencies) while the Malay Sultan would administer Lingga and its dependencies, with each having no claim with the respective revenues of the other. Though the island personally belonged to Engku Puteri Hamidah, it was administered by her brother, Raja Ja'afar (the Yang di-Pertuan Muda) and later by his descendants. The effective division of the state by the sultan afforded an unprecedented opportunity for Raja Ja'afar to develop Penyengat as the heart of the kingdom. Penyengat, situated in the middle of the maritime trade and commercial routes of the Malay World, soon become a key Malay literary and cultural centre in the 19th century.

=== Religion ===
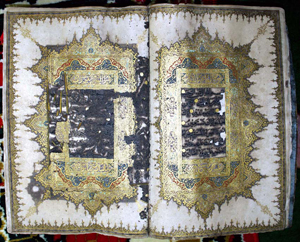
A Mus'haf of the Quran dating from the Riau-Lingga Sultanate period, with East coast Malay Peninsula styled gloss finish.

Inspired to elevate the status of Islam to a greater height in Riau-Lingga, Raja Jaafar begun to invite religious clerics and scholars to the palace court. The Islamisation process begun to accelerate during the time of his successor, Raja Ali. Adhering to a stricter interpretation of the Quran, Raja Ali began to promulgate Islamic law and custom into the region. During his rule, the Naqshbandi order gained prominence in Penyengat, with all the princes and court officials required to study areligion, Sufism and improve their Quranic recitation. The Dutch described the Bugis Yang di-Pertuan Mudas and his family as fanatical Muslims, narrowly focused on the Islamic studies.

Raja Ali adhered to the view of Al-Ghazali about the business of government, adopting the theory of the bond between a ruler and religion. Reforms were instituted and gambling, cockfighting, the mixing of unmarried men and women and the wearing of gold or silk are all forbidden, and women are required to be veiled. Pirates and evildoers were severely punished and the miscreants exiled. The public were all required to perform the five obligatory prayers, with a special dawn watch constituted to ensure the people rose for the subuh (fajr) prayer. This was continued during the rule of Raja Abdullah, who was equally a devoted member of the Sufi order.

The role of the imam in Riau-Lingga was regarded as authoritative concerning the matters of Islamic law, as much as the respective roles of the Sultan and Yang di-Pertuan Muda under the pledge of allegiance. The administration adhered to the separation of powers between the imam, the sultan and the ulema, each acting within their own function to create an Islamic state.

Riau was hailed at the time as the Serambi Mekah (Gateway to Mecca) and the people of Riau would visit Penyengat before embarking on their Hajj pilgrimage to the Muslim holy land. The mosque was the centerpiece of the society, not solely as a religious centre, but also for scholarship, law and administration offices. The mosque, located opposite of the Dutch administrative centre of Tanjung Pinang, stood for the strength of the Yang di-Pertuan Mudas through their devotion to Islam.

=== Malayness ===
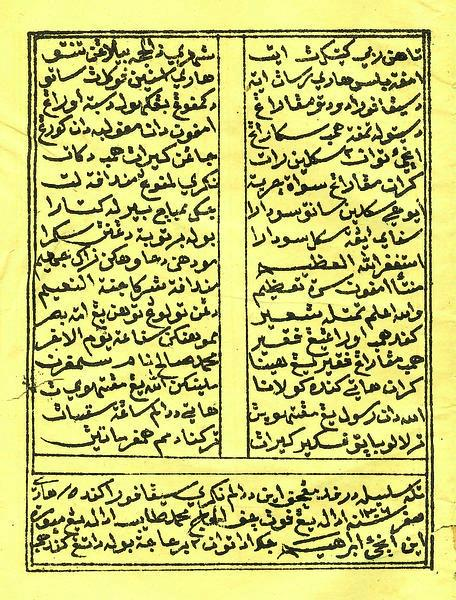
A manuscript of Gurindam 12, a morale and religious guidance originally written in Jawi script, completed in 1264AH (1847AD).

By the mid 19th century, the Bugis Yang di-Pertuan Mudas began to perceive themselves as guardians of a quintessential Malay culture, while at the same time the Bugis language and customs within the diaspora community in Riau-Lingga gradually declined after being largely Malayised over several generations. Several customary practices and did survive however, for instance the revered position of women in society and the close affinity of kinship based on their common Bugis ancestry and heritage.

A prominent advocate of the Malay culture in Riau-Lingga was Raja Ali Haji, of Bugis-Malay extraction himself. He stressed the responsibility to preserve the Malay culture in society while the customs of the west and the Chinese were not to be duplicated. He further emphasised attention to the Malay language and how it should not be misappropriated by European use of the language.

Raja Ali believed that abandoning the Malay traditions would destroy of the world order and the Kerajaan (Kingdom), while adopting western and Chinese dress code would be tantamount to betrayal of Malayness. Raja Ali did not favour a forced compulsion of Malayness, but an appeal to maintain tradition in order to achieve harmony between man and man, man and ruler and man and Allah. The situation in Johor and Singapore differed to some extent from Riau-Lingga Sultanate, and many acts and habits of the rather westernised Malays there were frowned upon by officials in Riau.

=== Roesidijah (Club) Riouw ===
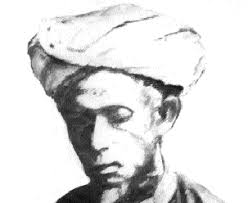
Ali Haji (1808–1873) was credited to be the author of the first Malay dictionary, this would later form the basis of the Indonesian language.

Cultural progress during the era was also attributed to an intellectual circle known as the Roesidijah (Club) Riouw or Rusydiah Klub Riau, formed in 1895. The club was inspired by the Jam’iyah al-Fathaniyyah, founded by Malay intellectuals including Syekh Ahmad al-Fathani in Mecca in 1873. The association was earlier known as the Jam’iyah ar-Rusydiyah, which later renamed itself as Rusydiah Klub Riau or Roesidijah (Club) Riouw.

The name was derived from the Arabic word "Roesidijah", meaning intellectuals and "Club" from the Dutch which literary translated as a gathering. The significance of the Arabic element in name of the organisation was the fact that the members of the group were mainly well-versed in Arabic, as Middle eastern countries were a preferred destination for Malays for furthering their studies during this time. The Dutch element in the name illustrated that the association was progressive, open to development and change.

The association was the first modern association in the Dutch East Indies. It played a major role in supporting intellectuals, artist, writers, poets and philosophers in the Riau-Lingga Sultanate, aiming to facilitate the development of arts, theatre, live performance and literature. The organisation took part in the major religious celebrations in Riau-Lingga, Isra and Mi'raj, Mawlid, Eid al-Adha, Eid al-Fitr and Nuzul Quran. The association also organised Islamic debates and intellectual discourses, so unsurprisingly it developed into an anti-colonial movement later in its history. The development of the association was backed by several main sources - sponsorship by the sultanate, 'publishing houses such as Mathba‘at al Ahmadiah (for literature) and Mathba at al Riauwiyah (for government gazettes) and the establishment Kutub Kanah Marhum Ahmadi library.

The literary culture of the Riau-Lingga Sultanate began to stall after 1913, when the Dutch dissolved the monarchy, resulting in an exodus of Malay elites and intellectuals to Singapore and Johor.

== Literature ==
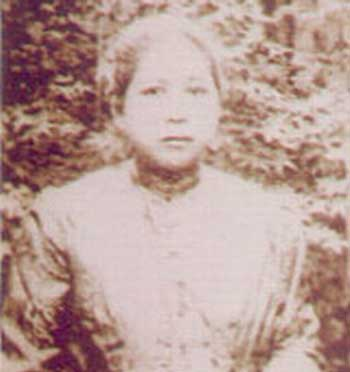
Raja Aisyah Sulaiman completed her first work, Hikayat Syamsul Anwar in 1890. The hikayat is one of the earliest pieces of feminist literature published in the Malay world. Photo from 1911.

A prominent figure in Malay and Indonesian literature in the Riau-Lingga Sultanate was Ali Haji of Riau, born in Selangor and raised in the Royal Court in Penyengat. He was celebrated as a prolific author, poet, historian, legal jurist and linguist. Some of his works are considered the Magna opera of the Malay literature, including Tuhfat al-Nafis ("the Precious Gift"), Kitab Pengetahuan Bahasa ("Book of Language") — the first dictionary in Malay and Gurindam dua belas ("The Twelve Gurindams"). His works played a vital role in the development of the Malay and modern-Indonesian language. He spent most of his life writing and researching the Malay language, history, culture and law.

The literary culture that flourished in Penyengat was acknowledged by the Johor delegation during their visit in 1868. 19th century Riau was marked by various publications of romantic and realist modes of Malay hikayats, pantuns, gurindams, syairs, poetry, historical and literary works by a generation of male and female writers and poets, paving the way for the development of Malay literary culture. Literature was not solely regarded as a source of entertainment, but also a source of mental stimulation and religious solace.

Raja Aisyah's Hikayat Syamsul Anwar, completed in 1890, was perhaps one earliest testaments of feminism to be found in Malay literature: it describes the secret life of Badrul Muin, a heroine who disguises herself as a male. The story illustrates that a woman can achieve a same level with a man. While her subsequent work, Syair Khadamuddin depicting the grief of its heroine Sabariah after the death of her husband at the hands of the pirates, it was presumed that the work was a semi-autobiographical account, following the death of her husband Raja Khalid Hitam in Japan, with the pirates being a metaphor for a foreign land.

Raja Ali Kelana's works in Riau-Lingga included Pohon Perhimpunan Pada Menyatakan Peri Perjalanan (1899) (a narration of his trip to the Tudjuh Archipelago between February and March 1896); Perhimpunan Plakat (1900) (a report on his journey to the Middle East) and Kitab Kumpulan Ringkas (1910) (a religious and psychological guide).

=== Library ===
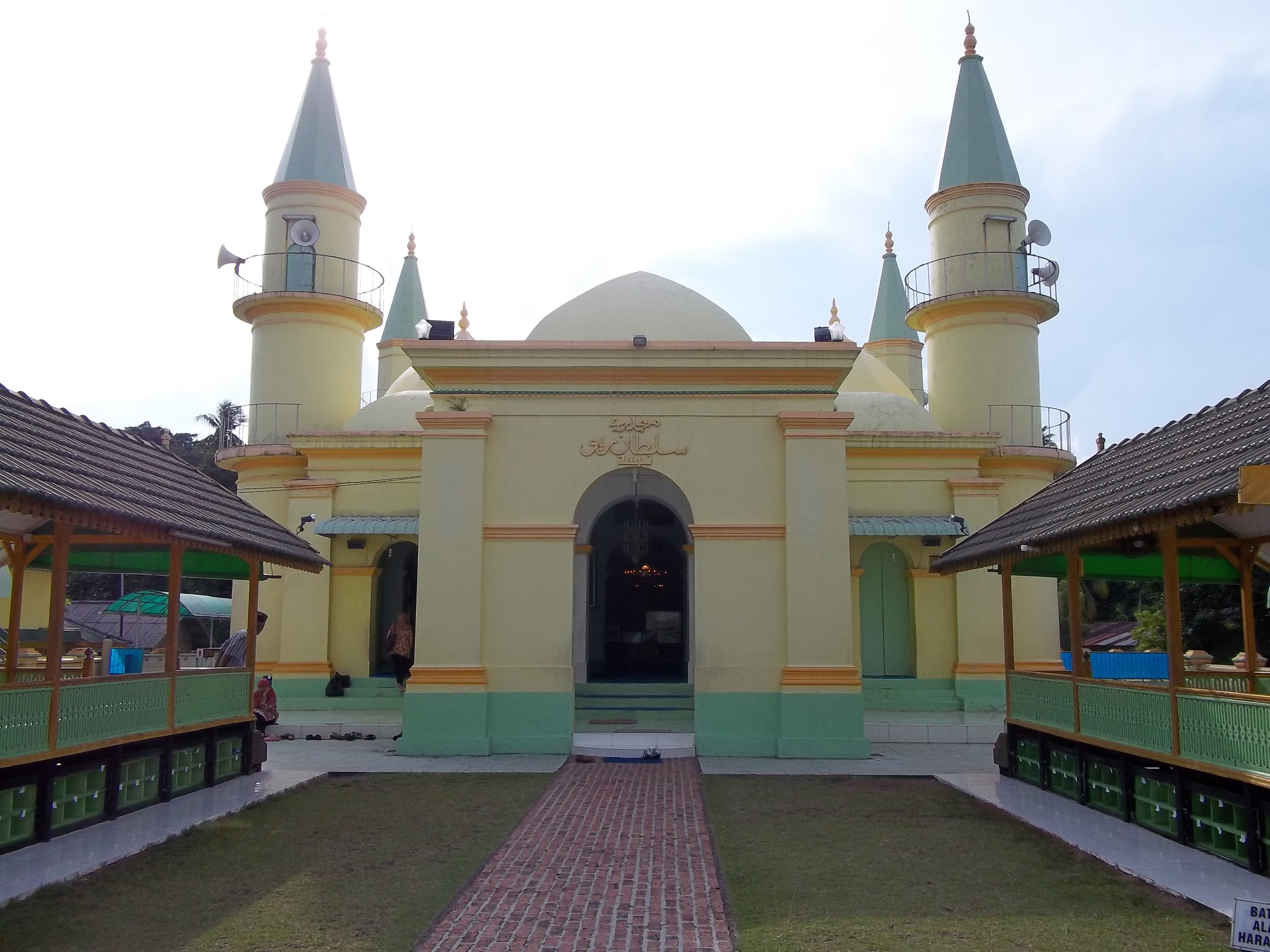
The Masjid Raya (Grand Mosque), built in 1803, is part of the legacy of the sultanate that can be found in Penyengat Inderasakti. The mosque was a home for the Kutub Kanah Marhum Ahmadi, an Islamic library.

A major figure for the literary culture in Pulau Penyengat was Muhammad Yusof Ahmadi, the 10th Yang di-Pertuan Muda of Riau. He was a member of the Naqshbandi, a major sufi tariqa. He stressed the importance of religion and knowledge through literature. He considered that a Muslim must be equipped with theological wisdom before performing his or her Islamic obligations. Without knowledge, in his view, all the duties of a Muslim would be in vain. He further stressed that knowledge and literature are kin to one another, literature born of the thirst for knowledge, and knowledge transfused by literature.

He founded the Kutub Khanah Yamtuan Ahmadi in 1866, the first Islamic library of its kind in the Malay world. The library collection was bought by Muhammad Yusof from the India, Cairo, Mecca and Medina costing him 10,000 Ringgits (Spanish Coins). A major part of the collection was devoted to Islamic theological studies. The library was located at the Penyengat Grand Mosque, so the collections were readily accessible to the traders, visitors and devotees of the mosque. Following his death, the library was renamed Kutub Khanah Marhum Ahmadi.

=== Publishing Houses ===
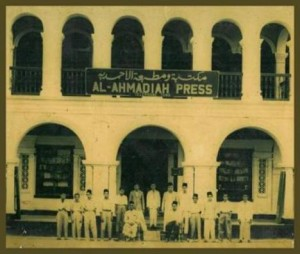
The Al-Ahmadiah Press in Singapore, a legacy of its predecessor from Riau-Lingga. (1925)

The history of printing in Riau-Lingga began when the sultanate established the Rumah Cap Kerajaan publishing house in Lingga in around 1885. The printing house published its materials using the Lithography technique, printed mostly in Jawi script and occasionally in Rumi script. Several major works were printed in this house during that period, including Muqaddimah fi Intidzam (a critical examination of the duty of the leader to his subjects and religion) in 1886, Tsamarat al-muhimmah (on law, administration of justice and statecraft) in 1886, Undang-Undang Lima Pasal (Code of Laws), and Qanun Kerajaan Riau-Lingga (Code of Laws) all written by Raja Ali Haji. In addition to Raja Ali Haji, the publishing house also published the works of Munshi Abdullah, the father of modern Malay literature.

In 1894, Raja Muhammad Yusuf al Ahmadi the 10th Yang di-Pertuan Muda founded another publishing house in Penyengat. It used two distinctive imprints, Mathaba'at al Ahmadiah for non-government publications and Mathaba'at al Riauwiyah for official government-related publications. The Mathaba'at al Ahmadiah mainly engaged with general knowledge, Islamic literature and translation works, including Makna Tahyat (Definition of the Tashahhud), Syair Perjalanan Sultan Lingga ke Johor (The journey of Sultan of Lingga to Johore) and Gema Mestika Alam (Echoes of the Universe). Among the works published by the Mathaba'at al Riauwiyah were Faruk Al-Makmur (the Laws of Riau) and Pohon Perhimpunan (The journey of Raja Ali Kelana to Tudjuh Archipelago).

All the publications of Al Ahmadiah and Riauwiyah were written in Jawi script, with the sole exception of Rumah Obat (a Medical Journal) by R.H Ahmad, a physician. The journal was written in Rumi in its title in 1894. This marked the increasing influence of Rumi script by the end of the 19th century. Nonetheless, Riau intellectuals during that period wanted the Jawi script preserved and maintained especially in matters of religion and culture.

Following the dissolution of the sultanate in 1911, Riau intellectuals headed north to Singapore and Johore. They re-established the Mathaba'at al Ahmadiah in Singapore to continue their printing activities, and they would distribute materials on general knowledge and Islamic literature for free to act against the Dutch occupation on their homeland. The publishing house was renamed the Al-Ahmadiah Press in 1925.

== Culture ==
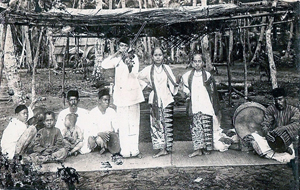
A troupe of local Riau Malay dancers performing the Joget Dangkong. Photo c. late 19th century.

As well as being celebrated for its literary contributions, the Riau-Lingga palace court was also known for the passion of its musical tradition. Musical performance was enjoyed as a form of entertainment by both the palace and commoners alike. With the coming of the Dutch, European influence on musical traditions slowly made their way into the court, as evidenced by the introduction of instruments such as the violin and tambur from the Western Hemisphere.

The introduction of the Western instruments to the royal court can be traced to the arrival of Raja Ja'afar from Selangor, the Yang di-Pertuan Muda of Riau-Lingga. Prior to his installation, he was a Klang-based merchant who gained prominence because of the tin trade. He came to Riau at the invitation of Mahmud III of Johor upon the demise of Raja Aji. After his installation, he constructed a palace and due to his love for music, he became a pioneer of western music in the kingdom. Adopting martial music as practised in the west, he sent several young men from Riau to Malacca to train with the Dutch on western instruments such as the violin, trumpet and flute.

One of the earliest accounts of the musical tradition of the royal court was left by C. Van Angelbeek, a Dutch official. During his visit to Daik, he observed that the Tarian Ronggeng (Ronggeng dance) was staged in the palace court, while the suling and rebab were the favourites among the locals. His report was published in Batavia in 1829.

=== Gamelan Melayu ===
Malay Gamelan developed in conjunction with Malay Joget Gamelan. In the mid-18th century, a team of court dancers and musicians was sent from central Java to the island of Penyengat, the royal island capital of the Riau-Lingga empire (present-day Indonesia). Javanese style court dance and gamelan were, therefore, introduced at the Istana Kuning (the Yellow Palace), the Penyengat palace. It was recorded that a Gamelan ensemble was invited from Pulau Penyengat to perform in Pahang in 1811 for the royal wedding of Tengku Hussein of Johor and Wan Esah, a Pahangite aristocrat. The dance was performed for the first time in public during the royal wedding in Pekan, Pahang. This marked the birth of Joget Pahang and the spread of Tarian Gamelan in the Malay Peninsula.

=== Mak Yong ===
The history of Mak Yong, a dance and theatrical performance, which gained prominence in the royal court of Johor, began in 1780, when two men from Mantang, Encik Awang Keladi and Encik Awang Durte went to Kelantan for their marriage. They returned south and settled in Pulau Tekong (now in Singapore) after their weddings, telling the locals about their experience witnessing the Mak Yong performance in Kelantan. Enthused by their tale, the people of Pulau Tekong went to Kelantan to learn about the theater performance. Ten years later, the first Mak Yong performance was staged in Riau-Lingga.

The news was then received by Sultan Mahmud Shah III. Attracted by the story, he invited the performers to the palace court. It was not long before Mak Yong become a staple in the dance court of Johor in Riau-Lingga. Apart from entertainment, the Mak Yong ritual also acted as a mystical healing performance. The main feature that set the Mak Yong in Riau-Lingga apart from aside from that of Kelantan, was that in Riau-Lingga the performance was enhanced by the use of a ceremonial mask, a feature unknown in Kelantan. The use of ritual masks closely resembles the Mak Yong performances staged in Pattani and Narathiwat, both located in present-day southern Thailand.

=== Royal orchestra ===
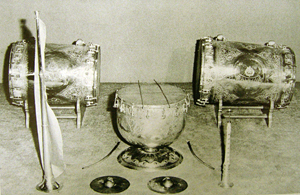
The Nobat that was used for the coronation of Sultan Abdul Rahman II (taken in 1885). The assembly was inherited by the Terengganu Sultanate and became a vital part of the regalia of the royal house. It was last used during the installation ceremony of Mizan Zainal Abidin as the Yang di-Pertuan Agong (King of Malaysia) on 27 April 2007.

The earliest account of the Musik Nobat Diraja (Royal Orchestra) was in the Sulalatus Salatin (Malay Annals), which stated that orchestra performances began during the reign of the ancient female ruler of Bintan, Wan Seri Bini, also known as Queen Sakidar Syah, who claimed to have traveled to Banua Syam (the Levant). The Nobat was used during the coronation of Sang Nila Utama, the king of ancient Singapore. The usage of the Nobat then spread to other Malay Royal Houses in the Malay Peninsula, Samudera Pasai and Brunei.

Between 1722 and 1911, the Nobat played during the coronation ceremony of the sultan, and was an instrumental part of the royal regalia as well as a symbol of sovereignty. It could only play on the order of the sultan, in royal ceremonies, with a special troupe of performers, known as Orang Kalur or Orang Kalau.

A new Nobat was commissioned for the coronation of Abdul Rahman II in 1885. It was reported that the Dutch colonial officer succumbed to abdominal pain each time the old Nobat was playing. This caused the coronation to be postponed several times, and the pains were widely believed to have been caused by supernatural forces. Tengku Embung Fatimah (then Queen mother) ordered a new Nobat to be made. The new Nobat bore a crest in Jawi script saying Yang di-Pertuan Riau dan (and) Lingga Sanah, tahun (year) 1303(AH) (1885AD). The new Nobat was used for the coronation of the sultan in 1885 and the old one was never used again. The old Nobat is now stored in Kadil Private Museum, in Tanjung Pinang, while the new one has been inherited by the Royal House of Terengganu.

=== Royal Brass Band ===
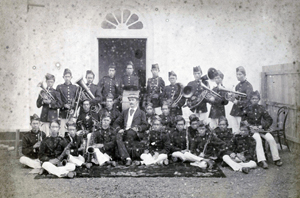
The Royal Brass Band with Heer Gunter, the instructor from Vienna, Austro-Hungarian Empire. Photo from c. 1880s, Penyengat Palace.

Western music achieved its greatest popularity during the reign of Sultan Abdul Rahman II. The genre was better known as cara Hollandia ("the Dutch way"). The seeds of western music which dated from the arrival of Raja Jaafar in 1805 matured and became an integral part of the official ceremonies and military parade of the palace court by the end of the 19th century Riau.

During this time western composition and playing techniques were adopted, along with instruments such as the trumpet, trombone, saxophone, clarinet and European-made drums. Consisting entirely of Malay members, the court brass band was led by Raja Abdulrahman Kecik, the Bentara Kanan (vice-herald) of Riau-Lingga Sultanate.

Music was performed during royal balls or banquets for Dutch visits or visits from other European delegations, usually invitees from Singapore. The brass band began in the 1880s, not long after Abdul Rahman ascended the throne. Its performance played a vital role in the celebrations of Crown Prince Yusof when he received the Order of the Netherlands Lion from Queen Wilhelmina of the Netherlands in 1889.

Due to their exclusive nature, being reserved to the nobility of the sultanate, the performances died out along with the band following the dissolution of the sultanate in 1911.

== Legacy ==
The sultanate is widely credited in the development of the Malay and Indonesian language, as various books, literary works and dictionary was contributed in the sultanate. These works formed as the backbone of the modern Indonesian language. Raja Ali Haji, was celebrated for his contribution on the language and honoured as the National Hero of Indonesia in 2004.

== See also ==
- Malayness
- Johor Sultanate
- Selangor Sultanate
- Malacca Sultanate
- Siak Sri Indrapura Sultanate
- Singapura Kingdom
- Srivijaya Kingdom
- Riau Archipelago

== Bibliography ==
- Barbara Watson Andaya (2003) Gender, Islam and the Bugis Diaspora in Nineteenth and Twentieth-Century Riau, Kuala Lumpur:National University of Malaysia, online edition Archived 30 March 2023 at the Wayback Machine
- Vivienne Wee (2002) Ethno-nationalism in process: ethnicity, atavism and indigenism in Riau, Indonesia, The Pacific Review, online edition
- Mun Cheong Yong (2004) The Indonesian Revolution and the Singapore Connection, 1945-1949, Singapore: KITLV Press, ISBN 9067182060
- Derek Heng, Syed Muhd Khirudin Aljunied (ed.) (2009) Reframing Singapore: Memory, Identity, Trans-regionalism, Singapore: Brill Academic Publishers, ISBN 9789089640949
- Virginia, Matheson (1989) Pulau Penyengat : Nineteenth Century Islamic Centre of Riau, online edition
- Barbara Watson Andaya (1977) From Rūm to Tokyo: The Search for Anticolonial Allies by the Rulers of Riau, 1899-1914, online edition
