= Letung Airport =

Letung Airport Bandar Udara Letung
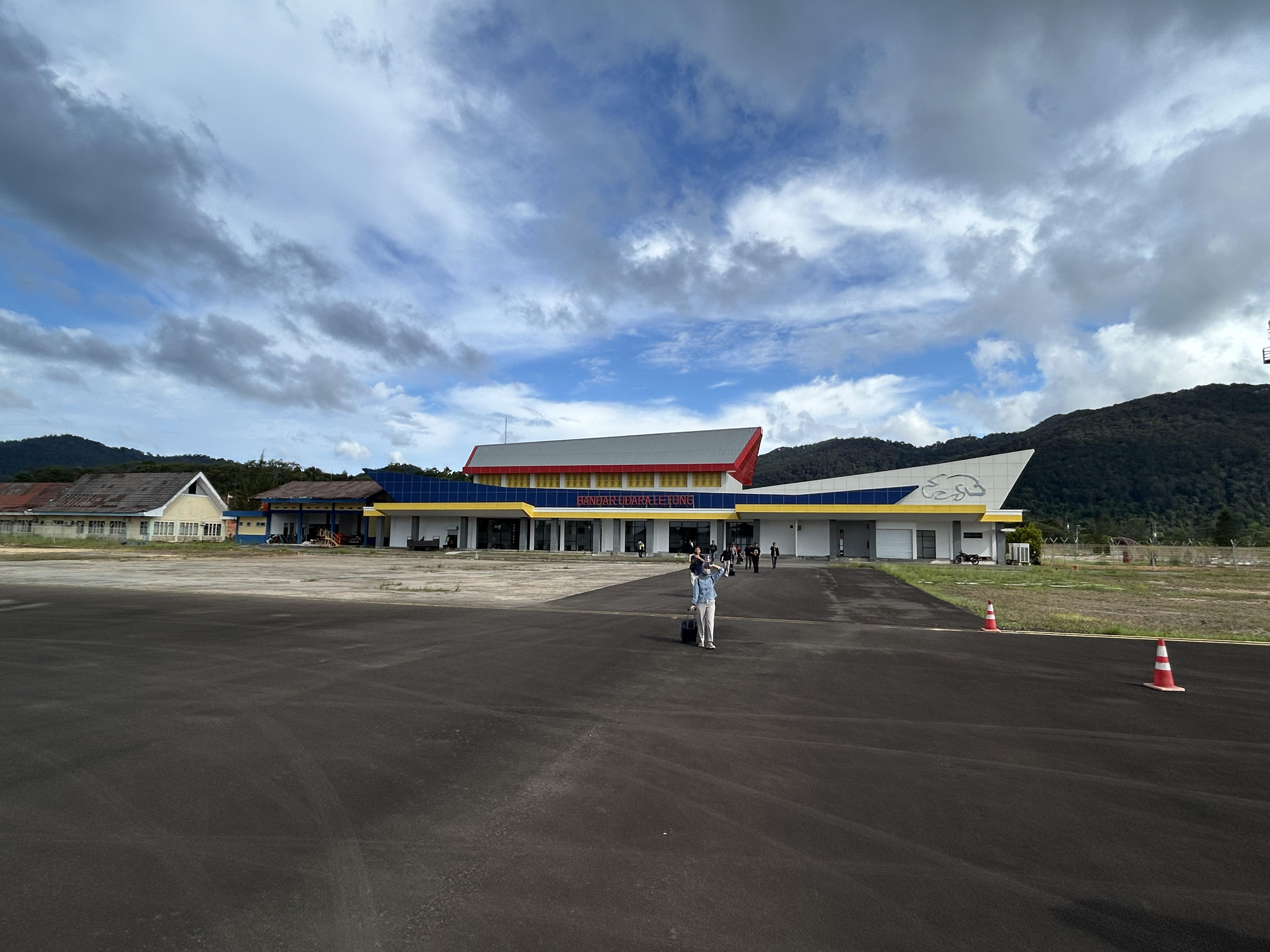
- IATA: LMU; ICAO: WIDL

Summary
- Airport type: Civil
- Serves: Anambas Islands Regency
- Location: Bukit Padi, East Jemaja, Anambas Islands Regency, Riau Islands, Indonesia
- Time zone: WIB (UTC+07:00)
- Elevation AMSL: 10 m (33 ft)
- Coordinates: 02°57′51″N 105°45′16″E

Map
- Location in South China Sea Location in Riau Islands

Runways
Direction	Length		Surface
Direction	m	ft	Surface
07/25	1,430	4,692	Asphalt

Letung Airport (IATA: LMU, ICAO: WIDL) is a domestic airport located on Jemaja Island of Anambas Islands Regency, Riau Islands province, Indonesia. Letung Airport is able to serve aircraft equivalent to ATR 72.

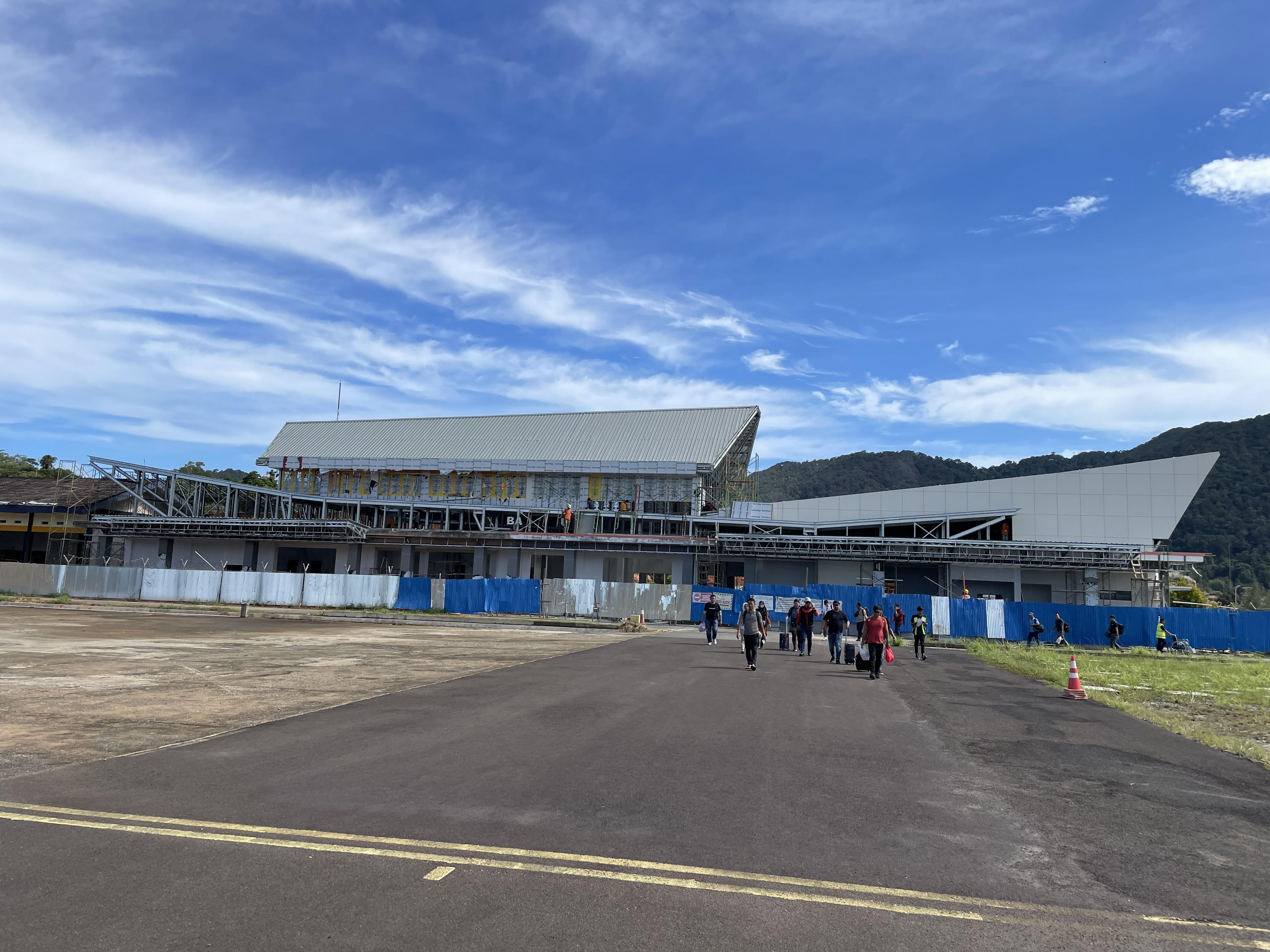

== Airlines and destinations ==
Airlines	Destinations
Wings Air	Batam
Susi Air	Tanjung Pinang

== Statistics ==
Frequency of flights at Letung Airport
Rank	Destinations	Frequency (weekly)	Airline(s)
1	Batam, Riau Islands	10	Susi Air, Wings Air
2	Tanjung Pinang, Riau Islands	2	Susi Air
