= Jemaja Island =

Island in Indonesia

Native name: Pulau Jemaja
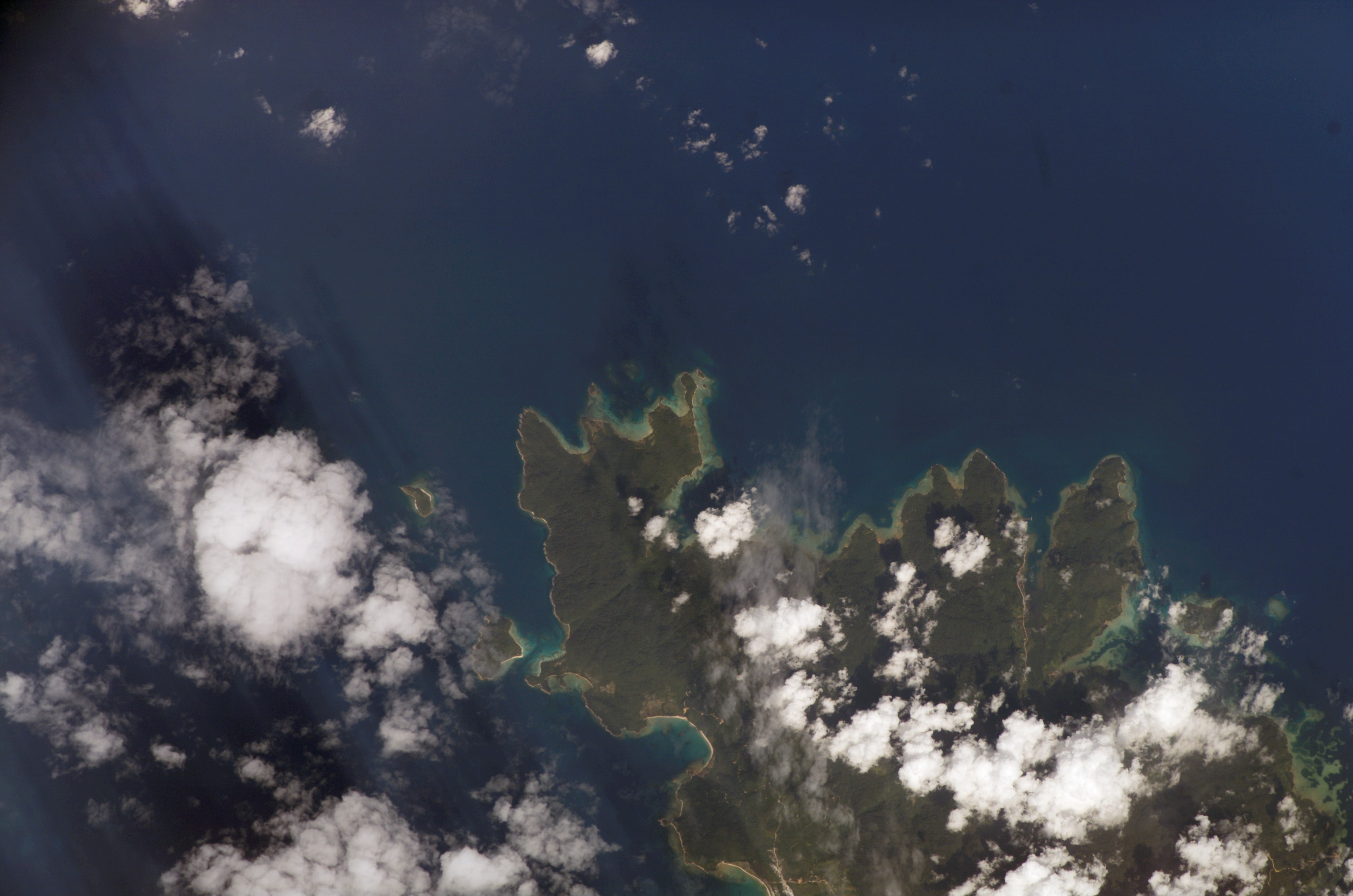
- E. COAST OF JEMAJA ISLAND, C.

Geography
- Coordinates: 2°55′N 105°45′E
- Archipelago: Tudjuh Archipelago
- Adjacent to: South China Sea
- Area: 216.29 km^{2} (83.51 sq mi)

Jemaja Island is the most westerly of the main islands in the Anambas Islands Regency, part of the province of Riau Islands within Indonesia. The island is administered (including small offshore islands) as three districts of the regency.

== Description ==
The island is located in the Anambas Islands in the South China Sea. Jemaja is close to the strategically important Singapore Strait. The island is populated with several villages and is heavily vegetated, including thick mangrove groves, and the waters off Jemaja are rich with corals. The island is served by Letung Airport.

The economy of Jemaja is small, but the island has been considered for increased economic investment to promote its use as a tourist destination. Several sources have noted that the island possesses beautiful beaches. The island has also been considered as a quarantine area for livestock.

In the 2000s, the island was a center for pirate activity. From 2007 to 2017, 34 incidents of piracy/armed robbery at sea occurred off the Anambas Islands, some of which originated from Jemaja.
