= Bintan Regency =

Regency in Riau Islands, Indonesia

Bintan Regency Kabupaten Bintan
- Regency
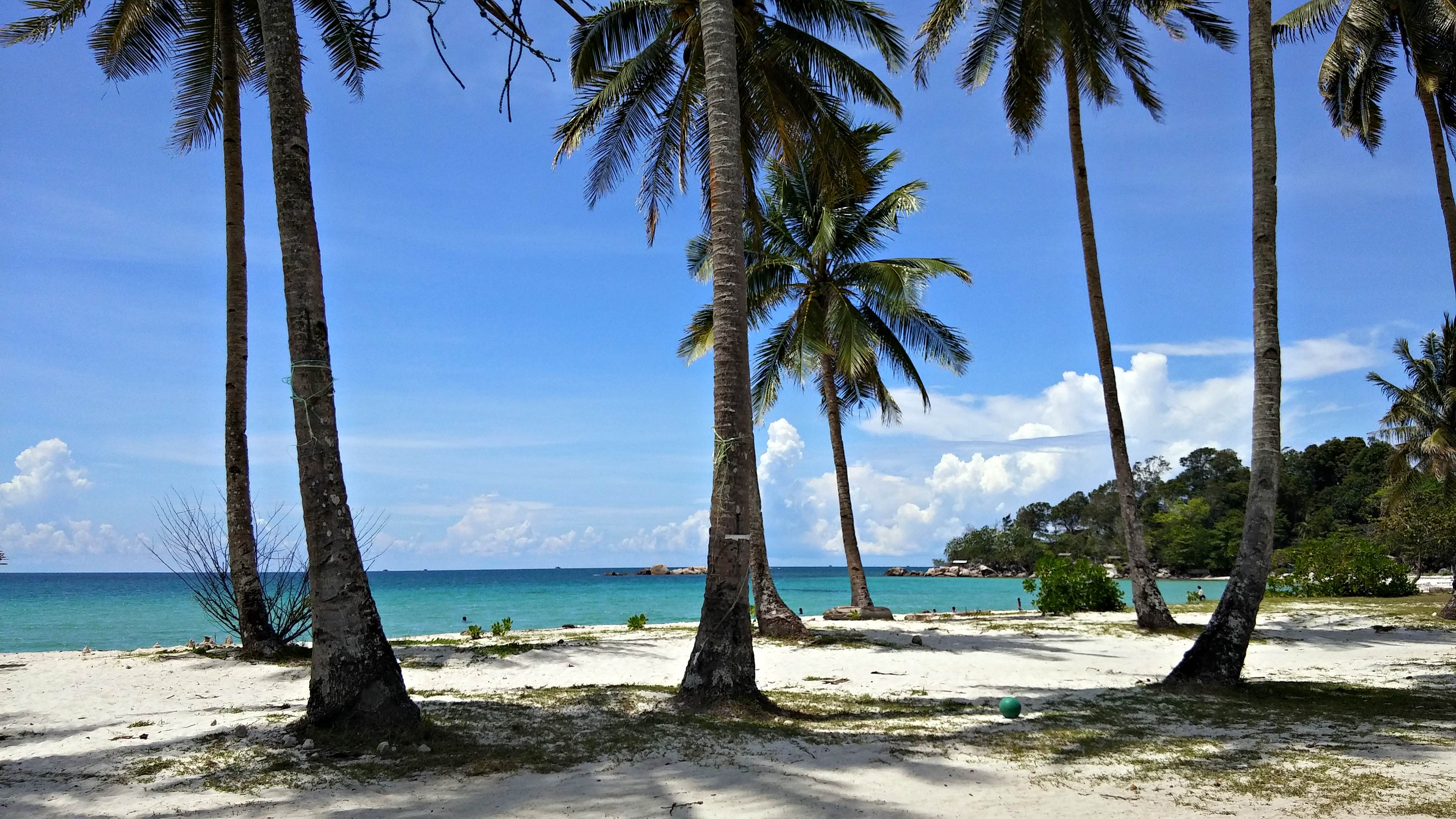
- Coconut Trees at Trikora Beach

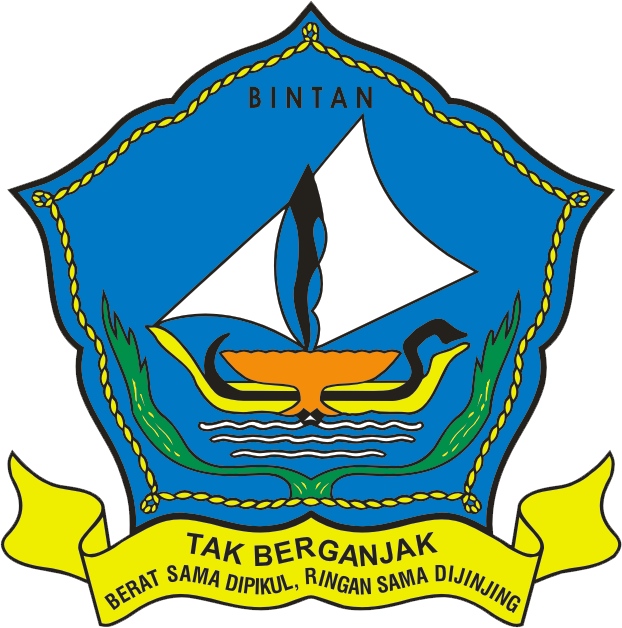
- Seal
- Motto: Tak Berganjak - Berat Sama Dipikul, Ringan Sama Dijinjing (Doesn't move - Heavy is the same as being carried, light is the same as being carried)
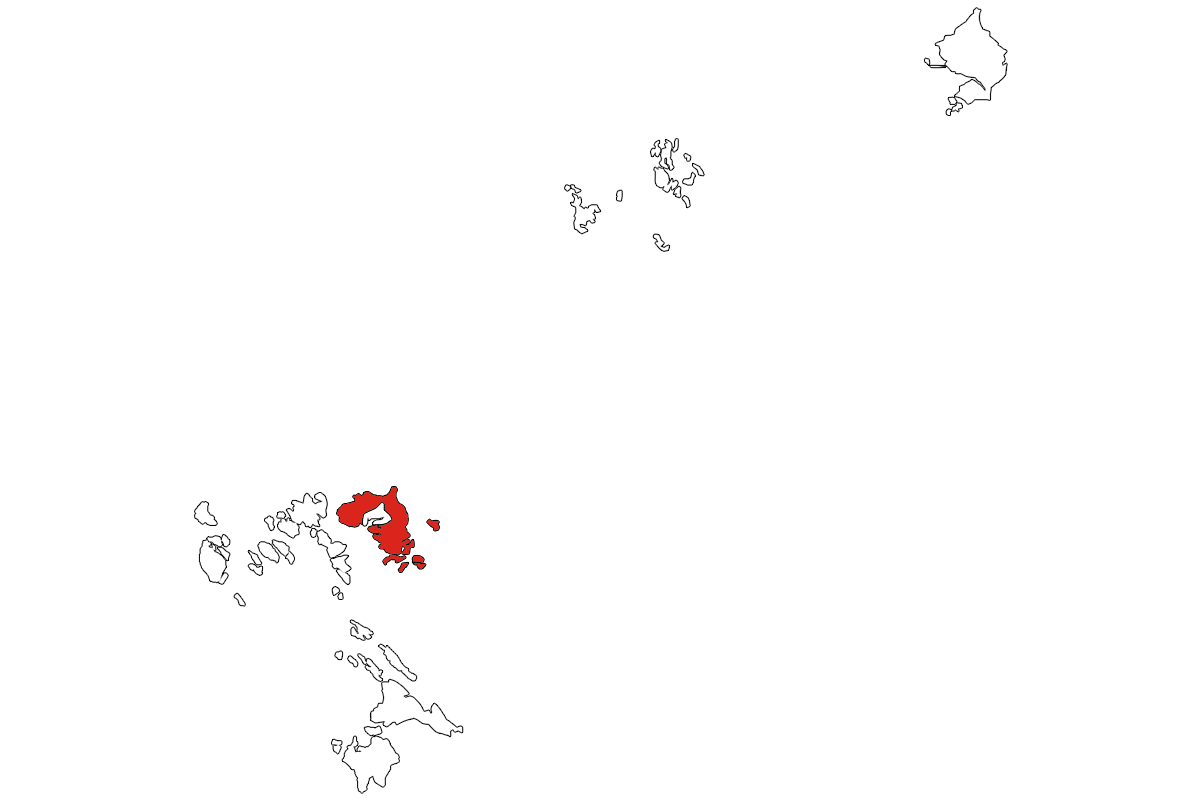
- Location within Riau Islands

- Location in Bintan, Sumatra and Indonesia Bintan Regency (Indonesia)
- Coordinates: 1.01°N 104.55°E
- Country: Indonesia
- Province: Riau Islands
- Regency seat: Bandar Seri Bentan

Government
  - Regent: Roby Kurniawan
  - Vice Regent: Deby Maryanti

Area
  - Total: 1,318.20 km^{2} (508.96 sq mi)

Population (2025 estimate)
  - Total: 182,355
  - Density: 138.336/km^{2} (358.290/sq mi)
- Time zone: UTC+7 (Indonesia Western Time)
- Area code: (+62) 770
- Website: bintankab.go.id

Bintan Regency (Indonesian: Kabupaten Bintan; pronounced [kabuˌpat̪ɛn ˈbin̪t̪an]), or originally the Riau Islands Regency (Indonesian: Kabupaten Kepulauan Riau; pronounced [kabuˌpat̪ɛn kəpuˌlawan ˈriau̯]) is an administrative area in the Riau Islands Province of Indonesia. Bintan Regency includes all of Bintan Island (except for the city of Tanjung Pinang which is separately administered as an autonomous area of the island) and also includes many outlying islands including the Tambelan and Badas Islands situated between Bintan and West Kalimantan; altogether there are 273 islands comprising the regency.

The Bintan Regency originally included all of the areas now comprising the Riau Islands Province, but on 4 October 1999 parts of the regency were split off to create separate Regencies of Karimun and Natuna (the latter originally including what in 2008 became the Anambas Islands Regency), together with the independent city of Batam. In 2001, the town of Tanjung Pinang on Bintan Island was also split off to become an independent city. In 2002, all these areas which had comprised the original Bintan Regency were brought together in a new Riau Islands Province when that was created from the archipelagic part of Riau Province. In 2003, a further regency – for the Lingga Islands – was created from part of the residual Bintan Regency.

Bintan Regency covers an area of roughly 1,318.20 square kilometres (508.96 mi^{2}). It had a population of 142,300 at the 2010 census and 159,518 at the 2020 census; the official estimate as at mid 2025 was 182,355 (comprising 93,605 males and 88,750 females).

== Location ==
The island is located 40 kilometres from Singapore, with an area of 1,467.84 km^{2}, and it had a population of around 330,000 at the 2010 census (including Tanjung Pinang), which by the 2020 census had risen to 387,181, while the official estimate as of mid 2025 was 423,621 (including Tanjung Pinang's 241,266 residents). These area and population figures include the entire Bintan Island as well as outlying islands and archipelagoes that are included within Bintan Regency and Tanjung Pinang City. Famous places in Bintan Regency include Trikora Beach, on the east coast, and the international Bintan Resorts.

== Administration ==
The regency is divided into ten districts (kecamatan) – tabulated below with their areas and their populations at the 2010 and 2020 censuses, together with the official estimates as at mid 2025. The table also includes the locations of the district administrative centres, the numbers of administrative villages in each district (a total of 36 rural desa and 15 urban kelurahan), and its postal code.

Kode Wilayah	Name of district (kecamatan)	Area in km^{2}	Pop'n census 2010	Pop'n census 2020	Pop'n estimate mid 2025	Admin centre	No. of villages	Post code	Names of villages Kelurahan (indicated by asterisk) and Desa
21.01.08	Teluk Bintan (Bintan Bay)	125.44	8,934	11,367	12,125	Sembeling Tanjung	6 ^{(a)}	29132: 29136	Bintan Buyu, Pangkil, Penaga, Pengujan, Tembeling, Tembeling Tanjung *
21.01.07	Bintan Utara (North Bintan)	43.26	21,193	22,527	25,753	Tanjung Uban Kota	5 ^{(b)}	29152	Tanjung Uban Kota *, Tanjung Uban Utara *, Tanjung Uban Selatan *, Tanjung Uban Timur *, Lancang Kuning
21.01.10	Teluk Sebong ^{(c)} (Sebong Bay)	285.72	16,019	18,234	20,083	Sebong Lagoi	7 ^{(d)}	29154	Berakit, Ekang Anculai, Pengudang, Sebong Lagoi, Sebang Pereh, Sri Bintan, Kota Baru *
21.01.15	Seri Kuala Lobam	123.50	17,632	17,912	20,554	Teluk Lobam	5 ^{(e)}	29153	Busung, Teluk Sasah, Teluk Lobam *, Kuala Sempang, Tanjung Permai "
21.01.06	Bintan Timur (East Bintan)	100.18	39,006	45,929	52,389	Kijang Kota	4 ^{(f)}	29150	Kijang Kota *, Sungai Lekop *, Gunung Lengkuas *, Sungai Enam *
21.01.04	Gunung Kijang	192.89	12,007	14,796	18,707	Gunung Kijang	4 ^{(g)}	29155	Gunung Kijang, Malang Rapat, Teluk Bacau, Kawal *
21.01.13	Mantang ^{(h)}	63.61	3,896	4,162	4,629	Mantang Lama	4	29156	Mantang Baru, Mantang Besar, Mantang Lama, Dendung
21.01.14	Bintan Pesisir ^{(i)} (Coastal Bintan)	116.11	8,005	6,857	7,102	Kelong	4	29151	Kelong, Mapur, Numbing, Air Gelubi
21.01.12	Toapaya	176.48	10,633	12,843	15,575	Toapaya	4 ^{(j)}	29157	Toapaya, Toapaya Utara, Toapaya Selatan, Toapaya Asri *
21.01.09	Tambelan ^{(k)}	91.02	4,975	4,891	5,438	Tambelan	8 ^{(m)}	29193	Teluk Sekuni *, Batu Lepuk, Kampung Hilir, Kampung Melayu, Pulau Mentebung, Pulau Pinang, Kukup, Pengikik
21.01	Totals	1,318.20	142,300	159,518	182,355	Bintan Buyu	51		

Notes: (a) includes one kelurahan - Tembeling Tanjung. (b) comprises 4 kelurahan (Tanjung Uban Kota, Tanjung Uban Selatan, Tanjung Uban Timur and Tanjung Uban Utara) and 1 desa.
(c) includes virtually all of Bintan Beach International Resort, which covers the entire north of the island. (d) includes one kelurahan - Kota Baru. (e) includes 2 kelurahan (Teluk Lobam and Tanjung Permai).
(f) comprises 4 kelurahan (Gunung Lengkuas, Kijang Kota, Sungai Enam and Sungai Lekop). (g) includes one kelurahan - Kawal.
(h) Mantang District comprises a number of islands lying to the south of Bintan Island, of which the largest are Pulau Mantang, Pulau Senjolong and Pulau Telan, but does not include any part of that island itself.
(i) Bintan Coastal District (kecamatan Bintan Pesisir) comprises numerous islands lying to the east and southeast of Bintan Island, but does not include any part of that island itself. The main islands in the district are Pulau Puto, Pulau Kelong and Pulau Puat (forming a group off Kijang Kota (town) in southern Bintan island); Pulau Gin Besar, Pulau Gin Kecil and Pulau Numbing further to the southeast; and various islands further north including Pulau Pangkil Besar and Pulau Mapur.
(j) includes one kelurahan - Toapaya Asri. (k) Tambelan District comprises the Tambelan Islands and Badas Islands situated between Bintan and West Kalimantan. (m) includes one kelurahan - Teluk Sekuni.

== Demography ==
=== Religion ===
Religion in Bintan Regency (2023)
religion	percent
Islam	87.53%
Protestantism	5.33%
Buddhism	4.31%
Roman Catholicism	2.47%
Confucianism	0.29%
Hinduism	0.06%
Others	0.01%

Islam is the dominant religion in the city, with 86.88% of the total population identify themselves as Muslim. Other religions are Christianity, which forms 7.52% of the total population, Buddhism, which forms 5.37% of the total population, Hinduism, which forms 0.09% of the total population and Confucianism, which forms 0.38% of the total population.

== Airports ==
Besides Raja Haji Fisabilillah Airport is near Tanjung Pinang in the south of the island, since 2012 a private company has been building an airport at Lagoi in the north of the island to facilitates tourism with investment $80 to $100 million; it is now predicted to be operational by the end of 2021.
