= Tambelan Islands =

Islands in Indonesia

Coordinates: 1°00′N 107°30′E

Tambelan Islands is a group of 68 islands off the west coast of West Kalimantan (Borneo), Indonesia, just north of the equator. The archipelago is located on the north opening of Karimata Strait which separates Borneo and Belitung island. Geographically it is part of the Tudjuh Archipelago, and administratively forms a district (kecamatan) of Bintan Regency within the Riau Islands Province. It covers a land area of 90.4 km^{2} and had a population of 4,960 in mid 2022. Major islands include Big Tambelan (Tambelan Besar), Mendarik, Uwi, Benua, and Pejantan. The islands are divided into eight administrative villages (kelurahan) - Batu Lepuk, Kampung Hilir, Kampung Melayu, Kukup, Pengikik, Pulau Mentebung, Pulau Pinang and Teluk Sekuni. As a historical side note; It was the first Dutch territory captured by the Japanese in World War 2.

== See also ==
- Anambas Islands
- Badas Islands
- Natuna Islands
