= Badas Islands =

Island group in Indonesia

Badas Islands is a group of islands in the Tudjuh Archipelago in the South China Sea between the Malaysian mainland to the west and the island of Borneo to the east. Administratively it is part of Bintan Regency within the Riau Islands province of Indonesia under island district/kecamatan of Tambelan.

The Badas Islands are located between 0°30'N and 0°39'N latitude, and between 106°58'E and 107°12'E longitude. They are 56 km southwest of the Tambelan archipelago (of which district they are administratively part), and lie outside the usual shipping lanes. The southwesternmost island of the group is Anakawur Island (Pulau Anakawur) (0.552837°N 106.977478°E) which rises to 94 m and has a sandy beach on its southwestern side, but otherwise has a rugged coastline. Pejamu Island (Pulau Pejamu) (0.514726°N 107.150443°E) which lies 17 km east-southeast of Anakawur, is densely forested and rises to 42 m. There is a sandy beach on its east side.

Kepahiang Island (Pulau Kepahiang) (0.649271°N 107.015564°E) is the largest and northernmost island of the group. It rises to 252 m and the northern and eastern sides are fringed by a drying reef. There is a small bay on the northeast side of the island above which is the largest settlement on the island.

== See also ==
- Anambas Islands
- Natuna Islands
- Tambelan archipelago
