= Sungai Guntung =

Sungai Guntung Sei Guntung
- Town
- Location of Sungai Guntung in Riau
- Coordinates: 0°17′44″N 103°36′41″E
- Country: Indonesia
- Province: Riau
- Regency: Indragiri Hilir Regency
- Subdistrict: Kateman

Area
  - Total: 46 km^{2} (18 sq mi)

Population (2016 est.)
  - Total: 14,088
- Time zone: UTC+7 (WIB)
- Postcode: 29255
- Area code: +62 779

Sungai Guntung, sometimes referred to as Sei Guntung and administratively the kelurahan of Tagaraja, is an Indonesian port town in Indragiri Hilir Regency, Riau with a population of over 14,000 in 2016.

Located across the mouth of the Guntung River, the town sits on the island of Kateman which is separated by a narrow channel from the eastern coast of Sumatra.

== Geography ==
Sungai Guntung is located on the western side of Kateman Island (Indonesian: Pulau Kateman), at coordinates of 0°17'44" N and 103°36'41" E. Administratively, it is both part of and the seat of Kateman District (kecamatan), which is part of Indragiri Hilir Regency. The kelurahan covers an area of 29.73 square kilometers.

== Demographics ==
The population of Sungai Guntung, according to Statistics Indonesia estimates, was 14,088 in 2016.
