= Tudjuh Archipelago =

Large group of islands in north-western Indonesia

The Tudjuh Archipelago (Indonesian: Kepulauan Tujuh, lit. "Seven Islands") is a large group of islands in north-western Indonesia, off the west and north-west coast of the island of Borneo in the South China Sea. Administratively the islands belong to the Riau Islands province of Indonesia. The Tudjuh Archipelago consists of four island groups, the Badas Islands, the Tambelan Islands, the Natuna Islands, and the Anambas Islands. The south-westernmost extent of the archipelago is 1°4′S 105°10′E.
