= Anambas Islands Regency =

Regency in Riau Islands, Indonesia

Anambas Islands Regency Kabupaten Kepulauan Anambas
- Regency
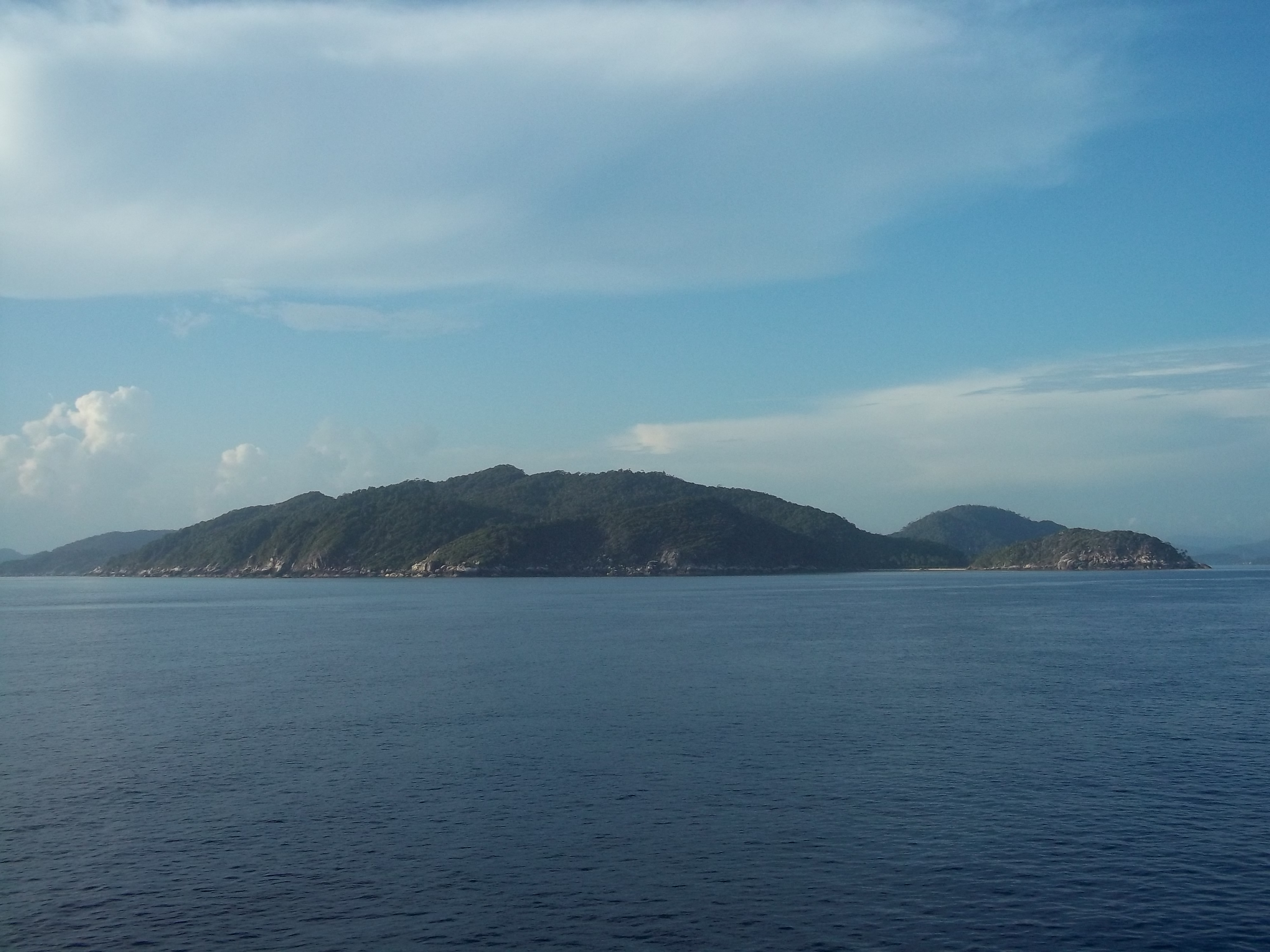
- Anambas Islands seen from far

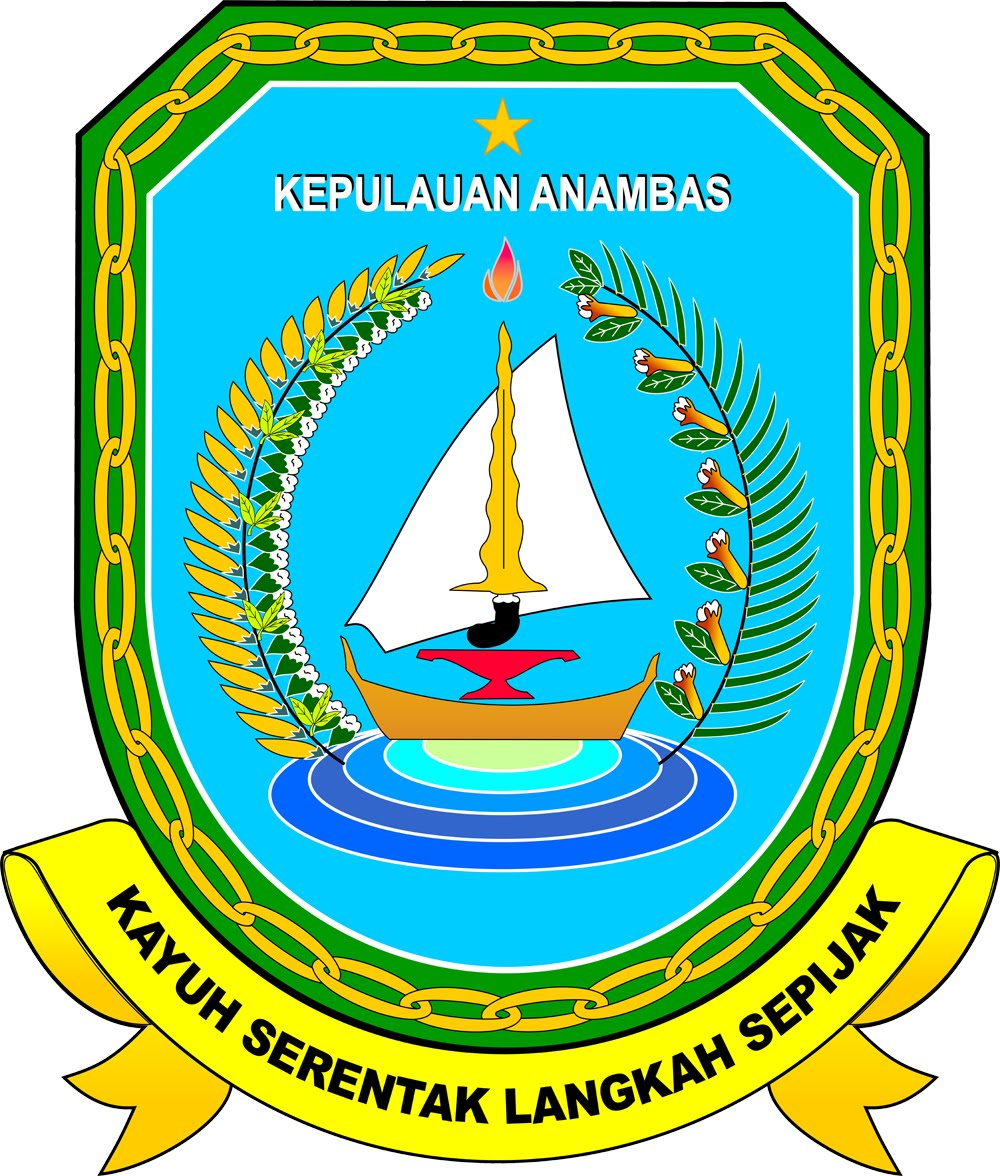
- Coat of arms
- Motto: Kayuh Serentak Langkah Sepijak (Pedaling Simultaneously Steps)
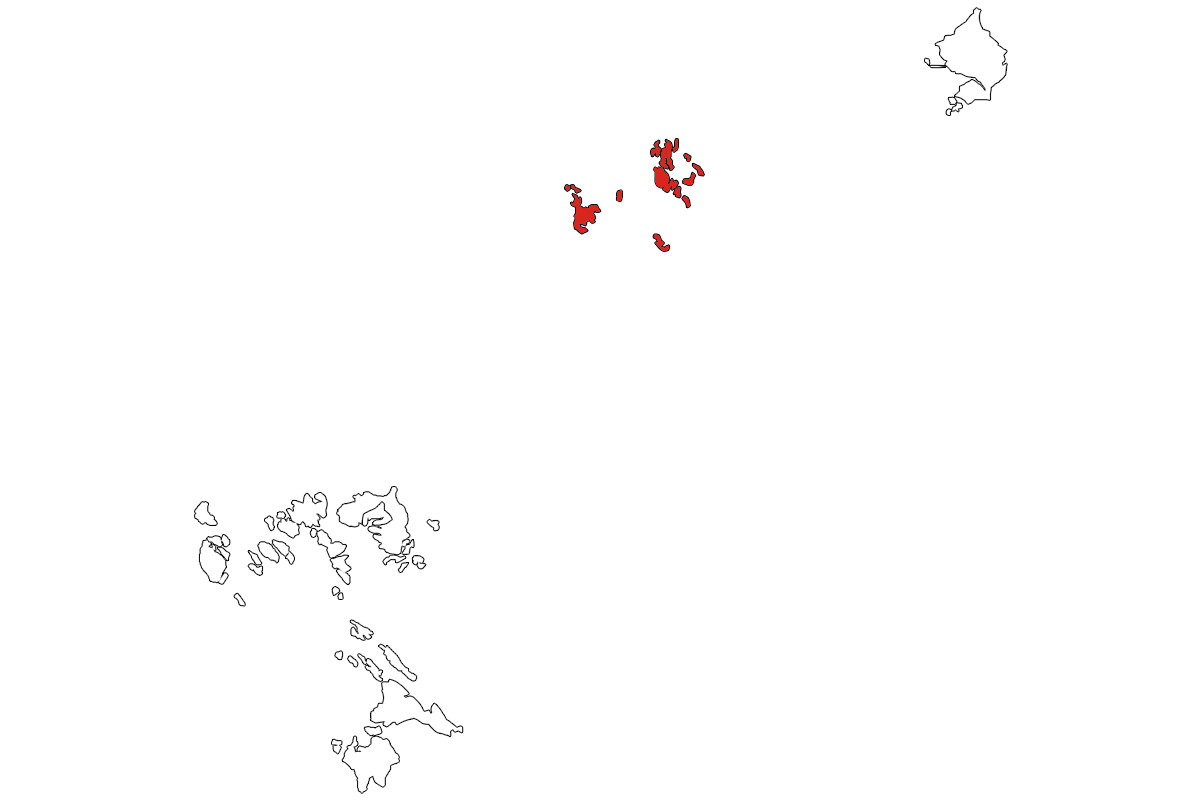
- Location within Riau Islands

- Location in Sumatra, South China Sea and Indonesia Anambas Islands Regency (South China Sea) Anambas Islands Regency (Indonesia)
- Coordinates: 3°6′N 105°40′E
- Country: Indonesia
- Province: Riau Islands
- Regency seat: Tarempa

Government
  - Regent: Aneng
  - Vice Regent: Raja Bayu Febri Gunadian

Area
  - Total: 518.78 km^{2} (200.30 sq mi)

Population (2025 estimate)
  - Total: 50,360
  - Density: 97.07/km^{2} (251.4/sq mi)
- Time zone: UTC+7 (Indonesia Western Time)
- Postcodes: 297xx
- Area code: (+62) 773
- Website: anambaskab.go.id

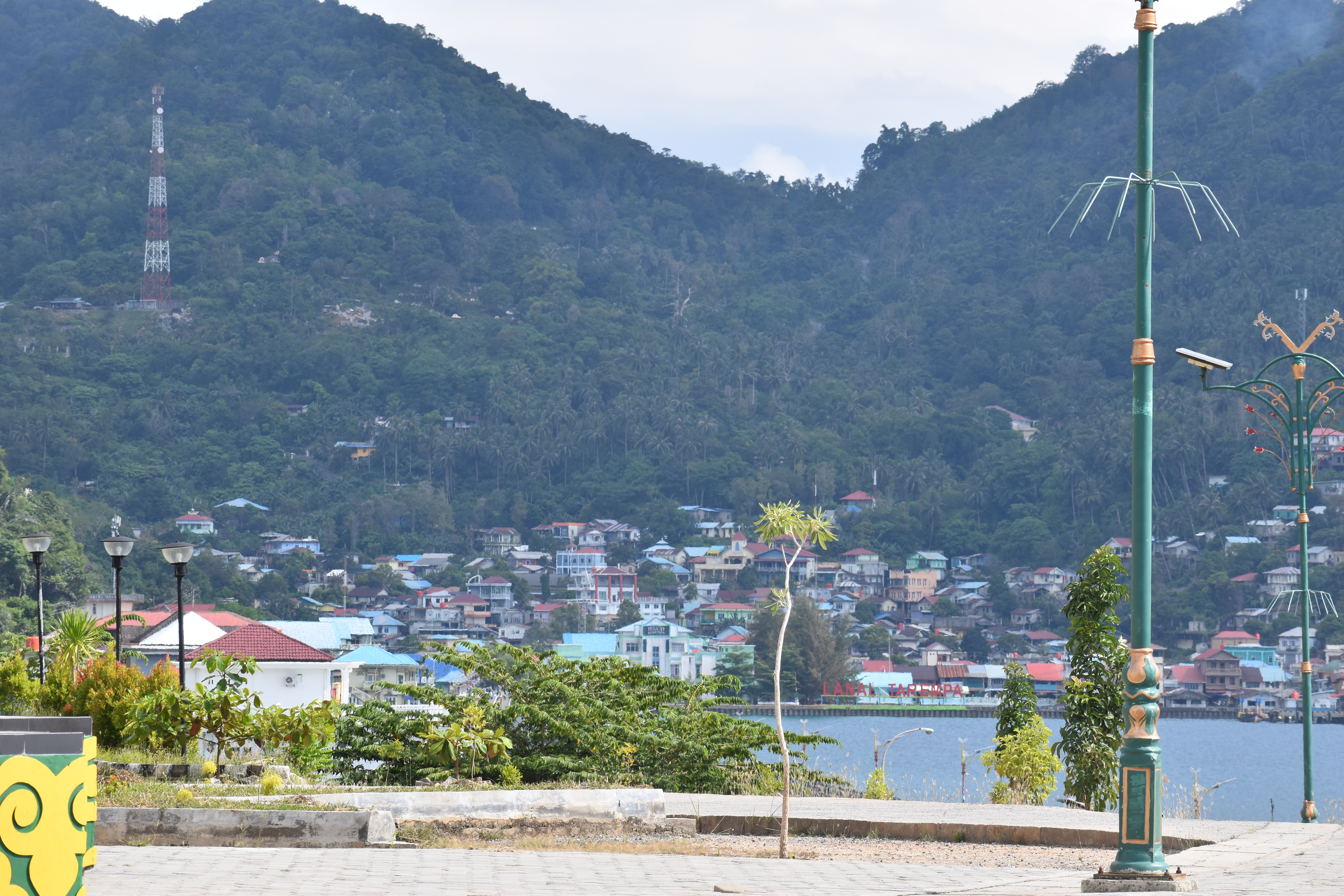
Tarempa, the administrative centre of the Anambas Islands Regency

Anambas Islands Regency (Indonesian: Kabupaten Kepulauan Anambas) is an island regency in the Riau Islands Province, Indonesia, located in the Natuna Sea. The regency consists of 255 islands, including five outer islands that are important for Indonesia's sovereignty boundaries, namely: Tokong Berlayar Island, Tokong Nanas Island, Mangkai Island, Damar Island, and Malangbiru Island. Anambas Islands Regency located 150 nautical miles (278 km; 173 mi) northeast of Batam Island in the Natuna Sea between the Malaysian Peninsula to the west and the island of Borneo to the east. Geographically part of the Tudjuh Archipelago. This island regency covers a land area of approximately 518.78 square kilometres (200.30 sq mi) spread over an area of approximately 46,664 km² of water. The regency had a population of around 37,411 at the 2010 Census. and 47,402 at the 2020 Census; the official estimate as at mid 2025 was 50,360. The administrative centre is at Tarempa on Siantan Island.

== Islands ==
=== Main islands ===
The islands fall into two main groups. The eastern group includes the principal island of Siantan (on which is situated the main town of Tarempa) and Bajau. Further north lie the islands of Matak and Mubur, together with a number of small islands. The western group is centred on the island of Jemaja (on which is situated the only other town of Letung), with a number of smaller islands to its north. Between these two main groups lie a number of smaller islands, of which Telaga Island is the largest, while Airabu Island lies due south of Siantan.

=== Matak island ===
The Anambas archipelago contains a large reserve of natural gas that is exported to countries such as Singapore and Malaysia. The island of Matak is the main base for oil exploration.

=== Pulau Bawah ===
Pulau Bawah, formerly known as Leeward island, is a clustered archipelago of six islands accessed by seaplane. It is located about 150 nautical miles northeast of Singapore and Batam, is a cluster of islets that collectively surround three lagoons, each of which suitable for snorkelling, scubadiving and coral beach activities. CNN rates the Anambas Islands are one of Southeast Asia's most spectacular coastal spots, with good snorkelling and diving spots, and Pulau Bawah in particular has good tourism potential.

Whilst the majority of the population generates their income from fishing and fishing-related industries, tourism has been gaining traction.

== Diving ==
The shipwrecked vessels Seven Skies and Igara attract a variety of indigenous marine life and offer diving opportunities.

== Administrative districts ==
At the 2010 Census, the Regency was divided into seven districts (kecamatan), but three additional districts have subsequently been created by splitting of two of the existing districts - Jemaja Barat from Jemaja District, and Siantan Utara and Kute Siantan from Palmatak District. The ten districts are tabulated below with their areas and their populations at the 2010 Census and the 2020 Census, together with the official estimates as at mid 2025. The table also includes the location of the district administrative centres, the number of villages in each district (totaling 52 rural desa and 2 urban kelurahan, the latter being Tarempa and Letung), and its post code.

Kode Wilayah	Name of District (kecamatan)	English name	Area in km^{2}	Pop'n 2010 Census	Pop'n 2020 Census	Pop'n mid 2025 Estimate	Admin centre	No. of Villages	Post Code
21.05.06	Jemaja		63.97	5,621	5,894	6,230	Letung	6	29792
21.05.09	Jemaja Barat	(West Jemaja)	17.57	^{(a)}	1,051	1,060	Impol	3	29792
21.05.05	Jemaja Timur	(East Jemaja)	148.40	2,028	2,597	2,770	Ulu Maras	4	29793
21.05.04	Siantan Selatan	(South Siantan)	32.36	3,177	3,829	3,970	Air Bini	7	29790
21.05.01	Siantan		56.63	9,920	13,108	14,200	Tarempa	7	29791
21.05.03	Siantan Timur	(East Siantan)	86.44	3,290	4,296	4,630	Nyamuk	6	29794
21.05.07	Siantan Tengah ^{(b)}	(Central Siantan)	18.78	2,755	3,352	3,490	Air Asuk	6	29795
21.05.02	Palmatak ^{(c)}		32.36	10,620	7,404	7,770	Tebang	7	29796
21.05.08	Siantan Utara ^{(d)}	(North Siantan)	39.25	^{(e)}	1,955	1,980	Mubur	3	29796
21.05.10	Kute Siantan		23.02	^{(e)}	3,916	4,260	Payalaman	5	29796
21.05	Totals		518.78	37,411	47,402	50,360	Tarempa	54	29796

Notes: (a) the 2010 population of the new Jemaja Barat District is included in the figure for Jemaja District, from which it was cut out.
(b) notwithstanding the district name, this is situated on Matak Island, of which it comprises the southern part.
(c) comprises most of Matak Island, plus nearly small islands. (d) notwithstanding the district name, this is situated on Mubur Island.
(e) the 2010 populations of the new Siantan Utara District and Kute Siantan District are included in the figures for Palmatak District, from which they were cut out.

== See also ==
- Badas Islands
- Natuna Islands
- Tambelan archipelago
