= Tanjungpinang =

Capital city of Riau Islands, Indonesia

- City
- City of Tanjungpinang; Kota Tanjungpinang

Regional transcription(s)
  - Jawi: تنجوڠ ڤينڠ
  - Chinese: 丹戎檳榔/廖都; Dān róng bīnláng/liào dōu (Pinyin)
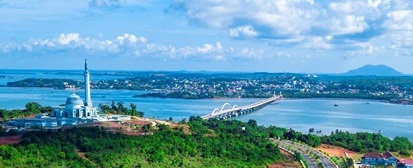
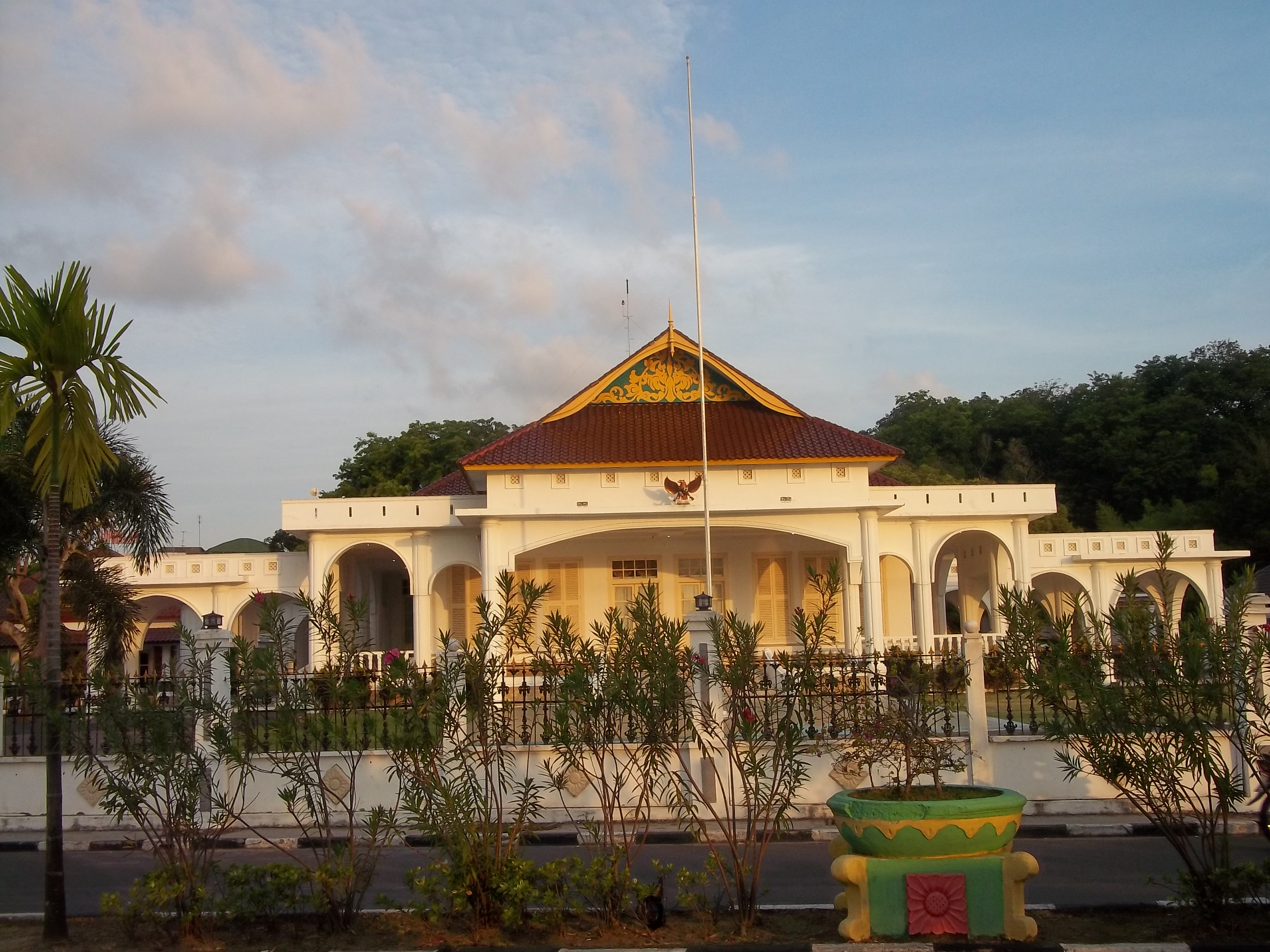
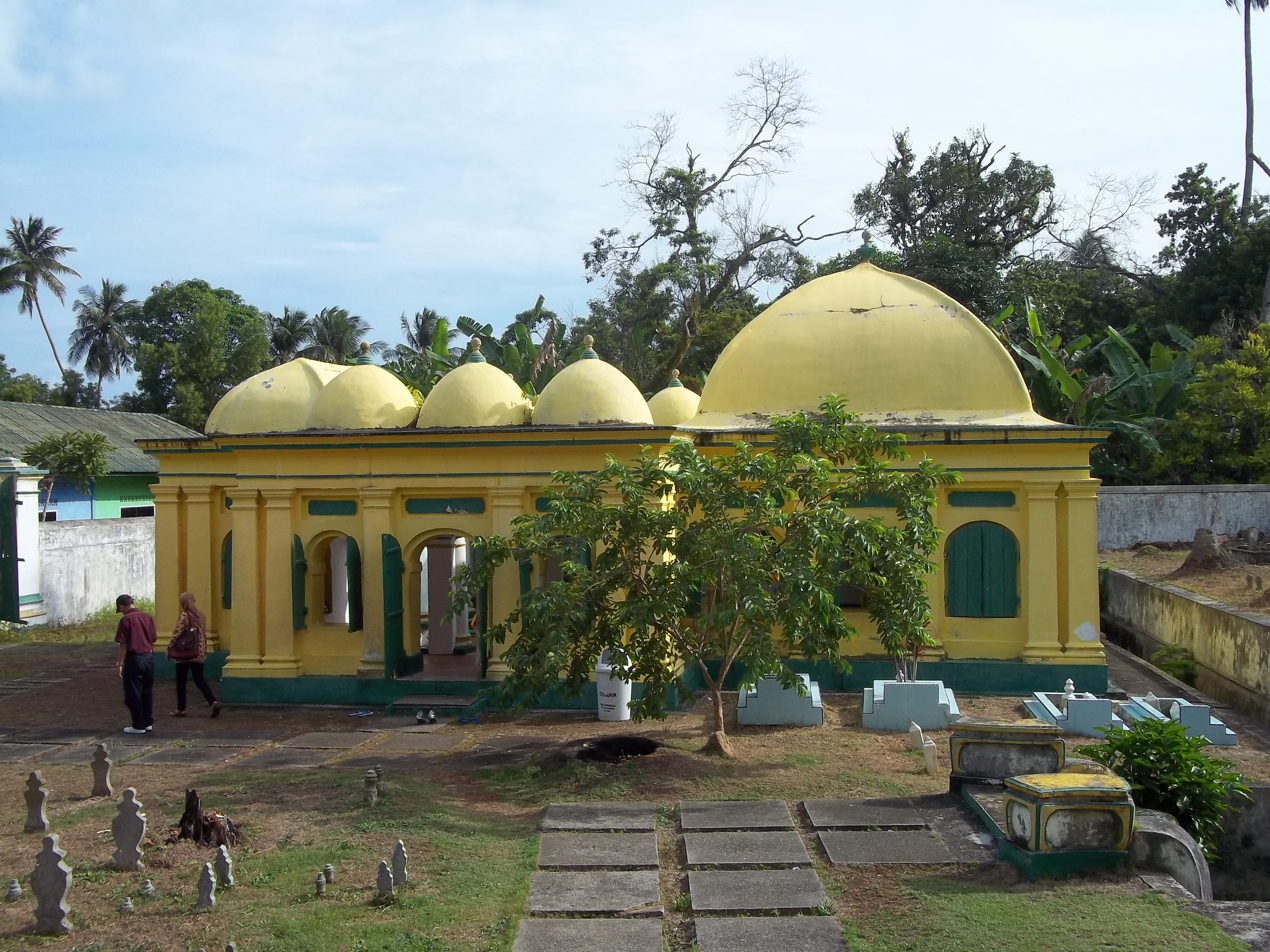
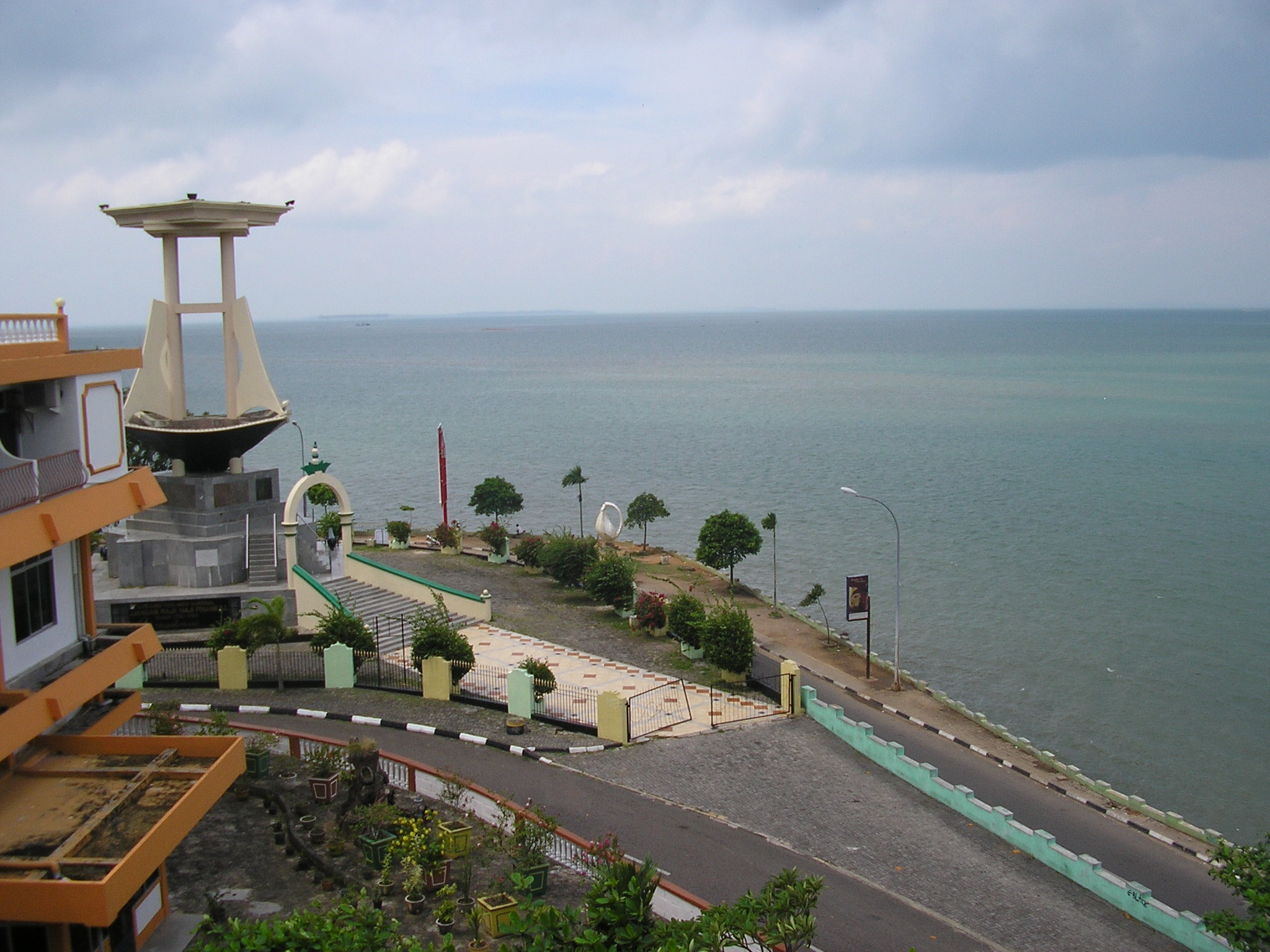
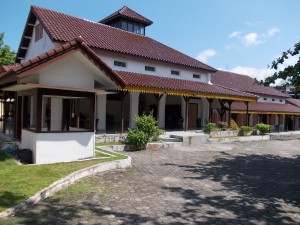
- From top, left to right: City view from Dompak Island, house of governor of the Riau Islands, tombs of Riau kings, Raja Haji Fisabilillah Monument, and Sultan Sulaiman Badrul Alamsyah Museum

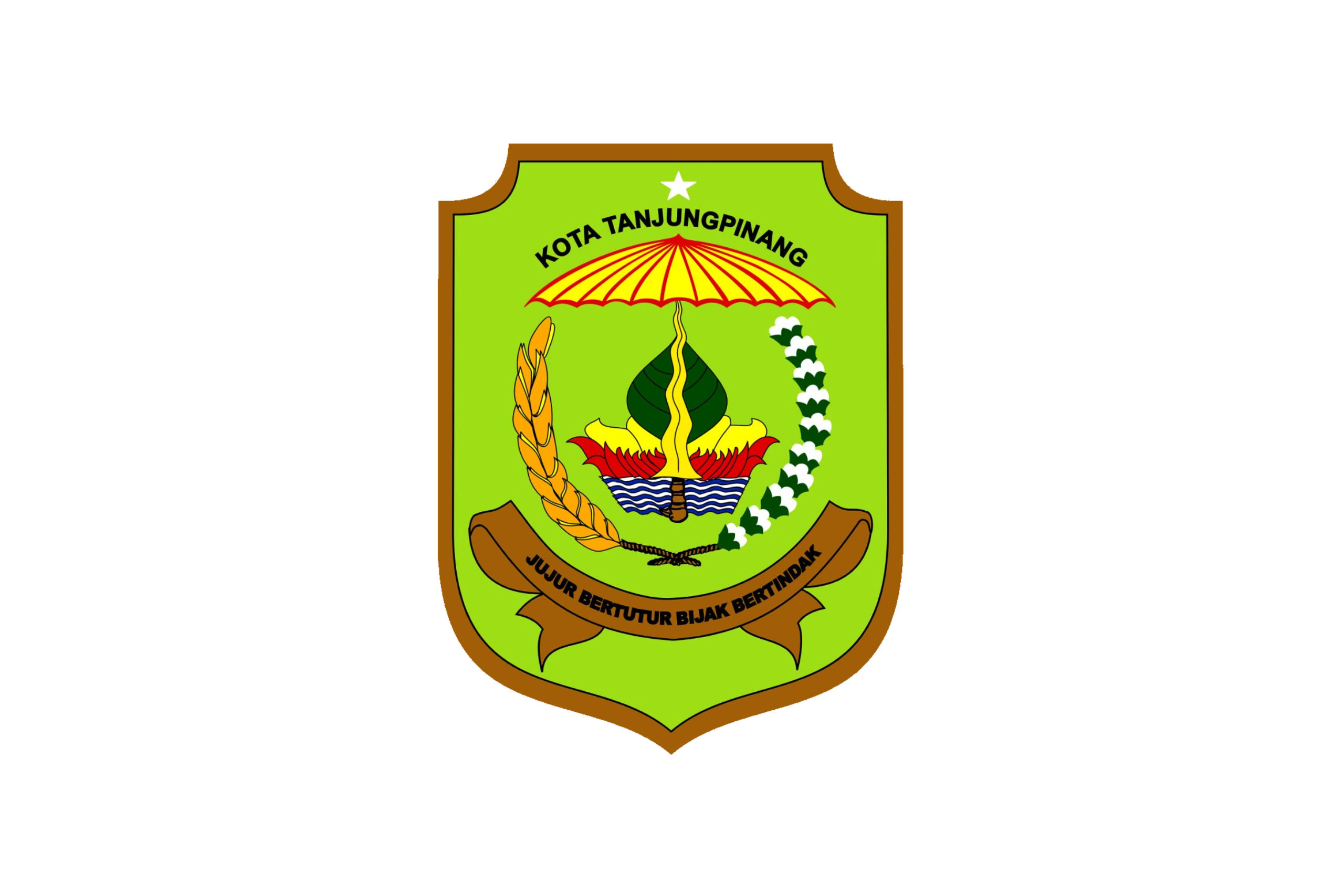
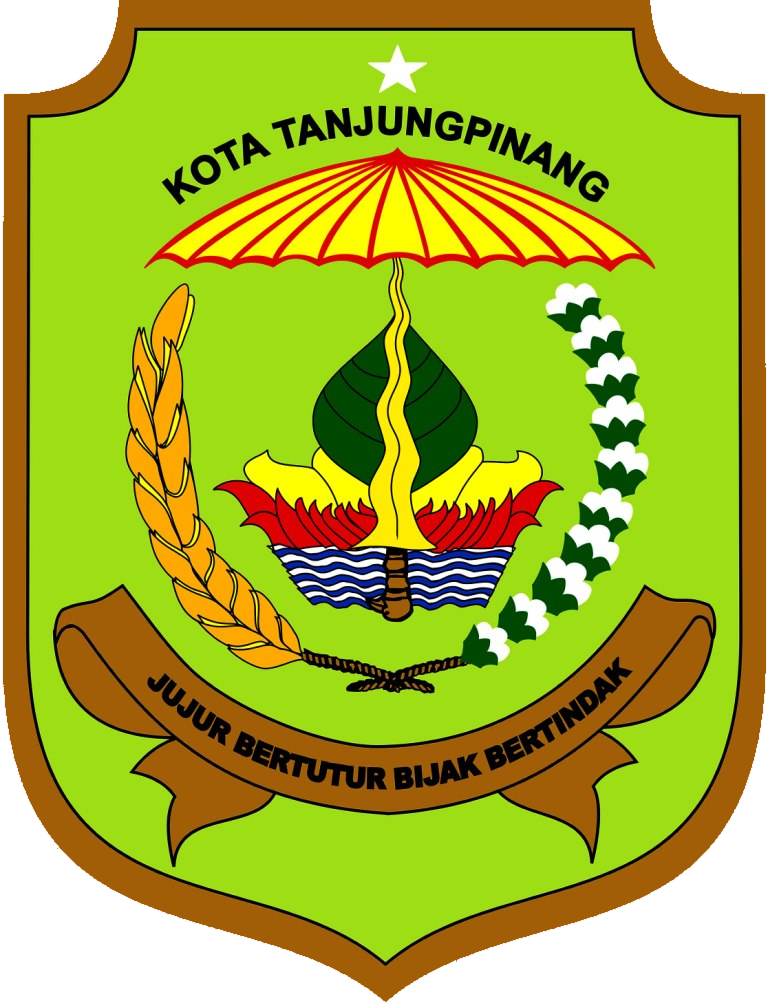
- Flag Coat of arms
- Nickname: Kota Gurindam (lit. 'City of Gurindam')
- Motto: Jujur Bertutur, Bijak Bertindak (lit. 'Honest in Speech, Wise in Action')
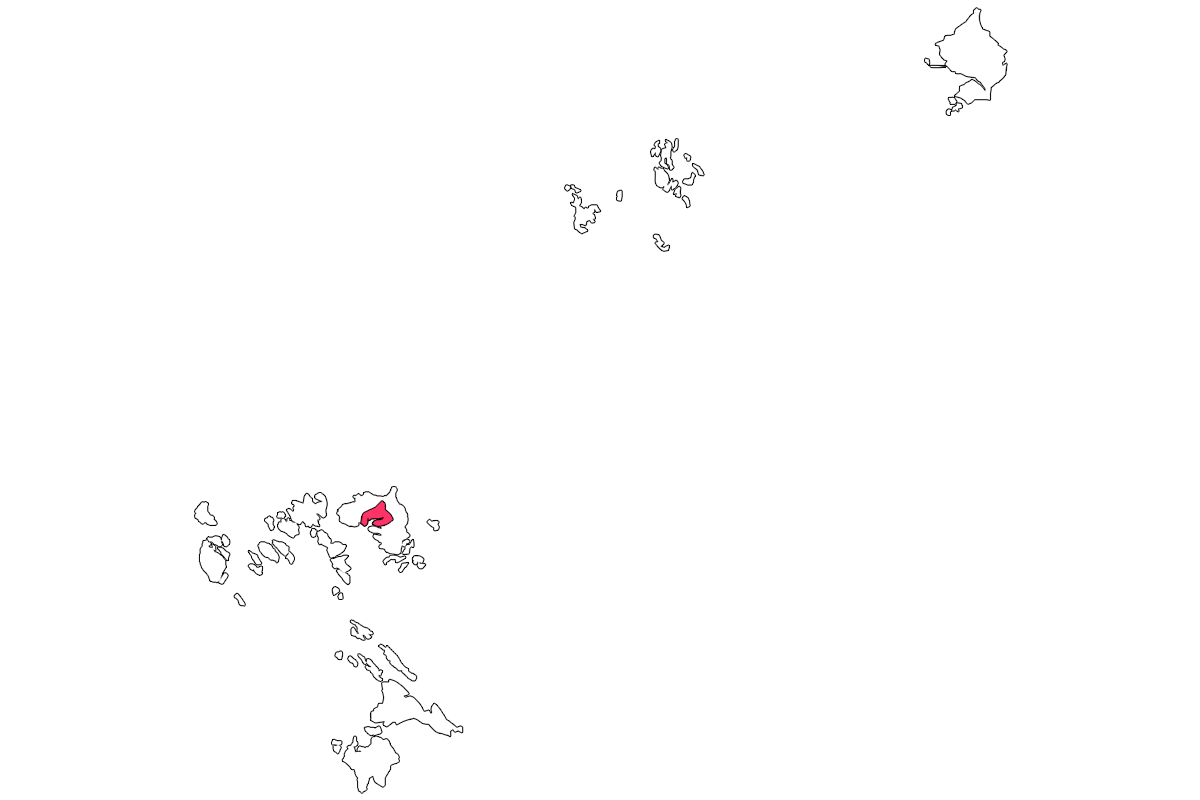
- Location within Riau Islands

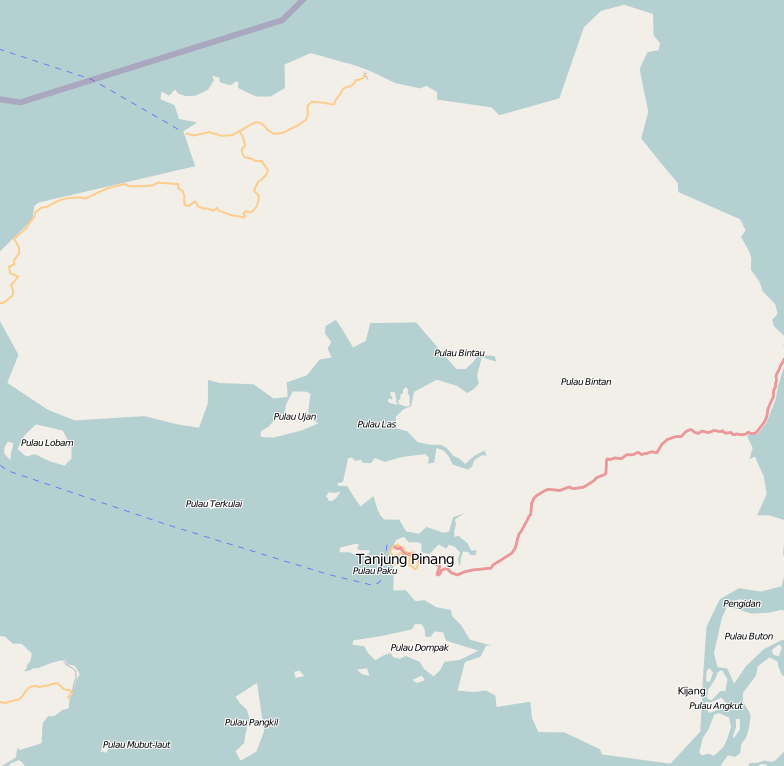
- Location in Bintan, Sumatra and Indonesia Tanjungpinang (Sumatra) Tanjungpinang (Indonesia)
- Coordinates: 0.918773°N 104.455415°E
- Country: Indonesia
- Province: Riau Islands
- Settled: Early 3rd century
- Founded: 6 January 1784
- Incorporated: 21 June 2001

Government
  - Mayor: Lis Darmansyah (PDI-P)
  - Vice Mayor: Raja Ariza
  - Legislature: Tanjungpinang City Regional House of Representatives (DPRD)

Area
  - Total: 812.7 km^{2} (313.8 sq mi)
  - Land: 149.64 km^{2} (57.78 sq mi)
- Elevation: 18 m (59 ft)

Population (mid 2025 estimate)
  - Total: 241,266
  - Density: 1,612.3/km^{2} (4,175.9/sq mi)
- Time zone: UTC+7 (Indonesia Western Time)
- Area code: (+62) 771
- Website: tanjungpinangkota.go.id

Tanjungpinang, also colloquially written as Tanjung Pinang, is the capital city of the Indonesian province of Riau Islands. It covers a land area of 149.64 km^{2}, mainly in the southwestern part of Bintan Island, as well as including other smaller islands such as Dompak Island and Penyengat Island. With a population of 227,663 at the 2020 Census, it is the second largest city of the province, after Batam; the official estimate as at mid-2025 was 241,266 (comprising 121,415 males and 119,851 females). Tanjungpinang is a historic city of the Malay culture, having served as the capital of both Johor Sultanate and Riau-Lingga Sultanate.

Tanjungpinang – whose name is taken from the position of a beach tree that juts into the sea – occupies a strategic location on the south of Bintan Island, guarding the mouth of the Bintan River. Tanjungpinang has ferry and speedboat connections to Batam, Singapore (40 km away), and Johor Bahru. The city is also served by Raja Haji Fisabilillah International Airport, located about 7 km east of the city center.

Over the centuries, Tanjungpinang came under the control of Sumatra, Malacca, the Netherlands, Britain, and Japan. These contacts each influenced its culture, also being a centre of Malay culture and trade traffic. In the 18th century, it was a capital of the Johor–Riau–Lingga Empire.

== History ==
The name Tanjungpinang is taken from the position of beach nut tree that juts into the sea. Trees that are in the Cape which is a guide for voyagers who will go to Bintan River. The Tanjungpinang River is the entrance to Bintan, where the Kingdom of Bentan was based in what is now the district of Bukit Batu.

=== Early history ===
Tanjungpinang's history can be traced to the early 3rd century, when it flourished as a trading post on the India–China trade route. Srivijaya, a Sumatra-based empire which nurtured trade with China, came to dominate much of the Malay Archipelago from the 7th to 13th centuries. It declined with the rise of piracy in the region, and by the 12th century Bintan Island became known by the Chinese as "Pirate Island".

According to the Malay Annals, a Srivijaya prince named Seri Teri Buana, fleeing from the sacking of Palembang, stayed on Bintan for several years, gathering his strength before founding the Kingdom of Singapura (Singapore). A century later, it too was sacked by rival powers, and its king founded a new city at Malacca. The Malacca Sultanate (1400–1511) became one of the great empires of the region, its territories including the Riau Archipelago. Malacca was captured by the Portuguese in 1511, and the exiled Sultan Mahmud Shah established his capital at Bintan, from which he organized attacks and blockades against the Portuguese. In 1526, after a number of attempts to suppress the Malay forces, the Portuguese razed Bintan to the ground.

=== Johor Sultanate ===
Alauddin Riayat Shah II, a son of Mahmud Shah, established the Johor Sultanate in 1528. Former-Malaccan territories were quickly brought under Johor's influence, including Bintan, where an important trading port called Bandar Riau was opened. As it prospered and a war with the Jambi Sultanate threatened Johor in 1722, the capital was moved to Riau, which became a centre of trade and Islamic studies much as Malacca had been.

A conflict with the Dutch, who had taken Malacca from the Portuguese, culminated with a Dutch fleet of 13 vessels besieging and attacking Riau. On 6 January 1784, they were met in battle by Malay and Bugis forces, and repelled with the destruction of the Dutch command ship Malaka's Wal Faren. Malay forces continued to harass the Dutch, and blockaded Malacca, but a defeat and succession crisis shifted power against them. The capital was moved from Riau to Lingga in 1788. The change of capitals has led to the Johor Sultanate sometimes being called the Johor–Riau–Lingga Empire.

The British gained control of Malacca from the Dutch in 1795. Attempting to increase their influence over the Strait of Malacca, the two powers each crowned a different candidate as Sultan of Johor–Riau during a succession crisis (1812–1818). This led to the partition of Johor–Riau under the Anglo-Dutch Treaty of 1824, which placed the territory south of the strait under Dutch control as the Riau–Lingga Sultanate.

=== Dutch colony and independence ===
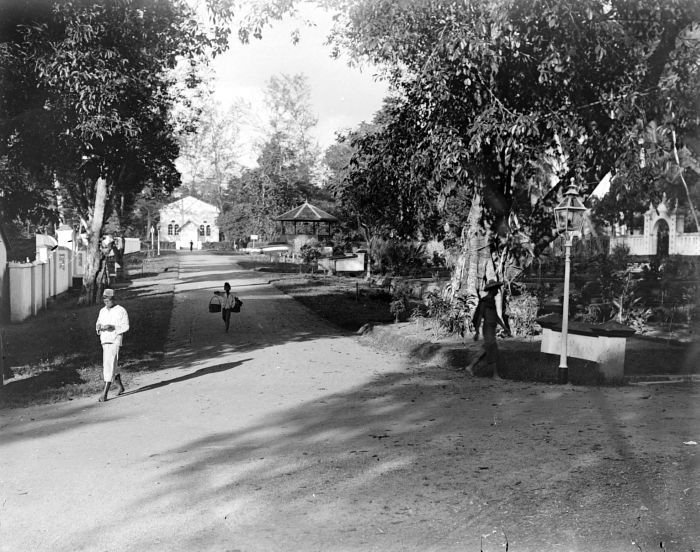
Street view with a Protestant church and the entrance of a mosque, c.1910

On 11 February 1911, the Dutch deposed the sultan for defying the colonial masters, and officially annexed the sultanate which was then administered from Tanjungpinang as the Riau Residency of the Dutch East Indies. A military base was also constructed at Tanjungpinang.

During World War II, the Japanese occupiers made Tanjungpinang the government centre for the Riau Islands. Control returned to the Dutch following the Japanese surrender, and the Dutch officially withdrew in 1950. Riau became one of the last territories merged into Indonesia, known as the daerah-daerah pulihan (recovered regions). Tanjungpinang briefly became the capital of Riau Province, until the capital was moved to Pekanbaru in 1960. A law passed in 2001 defined Tanjungpinang as an autonomous city with effect from 21 June 2001 (separate from Bintan Regency, of which it was previously a part), and it became the capital of Riau Islands Province when that province was created in 2002, becoming its second city (after Batam, formed as an independent city in 1999).

== Administration ==
The city (which is administratively separate from Bintan Regency) is divided into four districts (kecamatan), tabulated below with their areas and their populations at the 2010, and 2020 Censuses, together with the official estimates as of mid 2025.

Name of District (kecamatan)	Area in km^{2}	Pop'n Census 2010	Pop'n Census 2020	Pop'n Estimate mid 2025	No. of kelurahan	Post Code
Bukit Bestari	45.75	54,157	54,410	55,840	5	29122-124
Tanjungpinang Timur (East Tanjungpinang)	60.16	70,867	109,780	121,310	5	29122-125
Tanjungpinang Kota (Downtown Tanjungpinang)	39.41	17,026	19,226	19,680	4	29111-115
Tanjungpinang Barat (West Tanjungpinang)	4.55	45,309	44,247	44,440	4	29111-113

== Climate ==
Tanjungpinang has a tropical rainforest climate (Af) with heavy rainfall year-round.

Climate data for Tanjungpinang (Raja Haji Fisabilillah International Airport, 2000–2020)
Month	Jan	Feb	Mar	Apr	May	Jun	Jul	Aug	Sep	Oct	Nov	Dec	Year
Mean daily maximum °C (°F)	29.8 (85.6)	30.6 (87.1)	31.4 (88.5)	31.4 (88.5)	31.5 (88.7)	31.0 (87.8)	30.6 (87.1)	30.6 (87.1)	30.8 (87.4)	31.0 (87.8)	30.2 (86.4)	30.0 (86.0)	30.7 (87.3)
Mean daily minimum °C (°F)	24.1 (75.4)	23.9 (75.0)	24.0 (75.2)	24.2 (75.6)	24.7 (76.5)	24.4 (75.9)	24.2 (75.6)	24.2 (75.6)	24.0 (75.2)	24.2 (75.6)	24.0 (75.2)	24.2 (75.6)	24.2 (75.5)
Average precipitation mm (inches)	234.6 (9.24)	142.6 (5.61)	216.7 (8.53)	298.9 (11.77)	284.4 (11.20)	230.7 (9.08)	205.2 (8.08)	171.1 (6.74)	212.3 (8.36)	259.5 (10.22)	442.8 (17.43)	348.2 (13.71)	3,047 (119.97)
Average precipitation days	10.2	6.1	11.1	15.3	15.2	13.2	11.3	10.3	11.0	14.2	19.6	15.0	152.5
Source: Meteomanz

== Demographics ==
=== Religion ===
Religion in Tanjungpinang (2023)
religion	percent
Islam	80.77%
Buddhism	11.32%
Protestantism	6.25%
Roman Catholicism	1.43%
Confucianism	0.21%
Hinduism	0.02%

Islam is the dominant religion in the city, with 80.77% of the total population identify themselves as Muslim. Other religions are Buddhism, which forms 13.58% of the total population, Christianity, which forms 7.56% of the total population, Hinduism, which forms 0.02% of the total population and Confucianism, which forms 0.27% of the total population.

== Landmarks ==
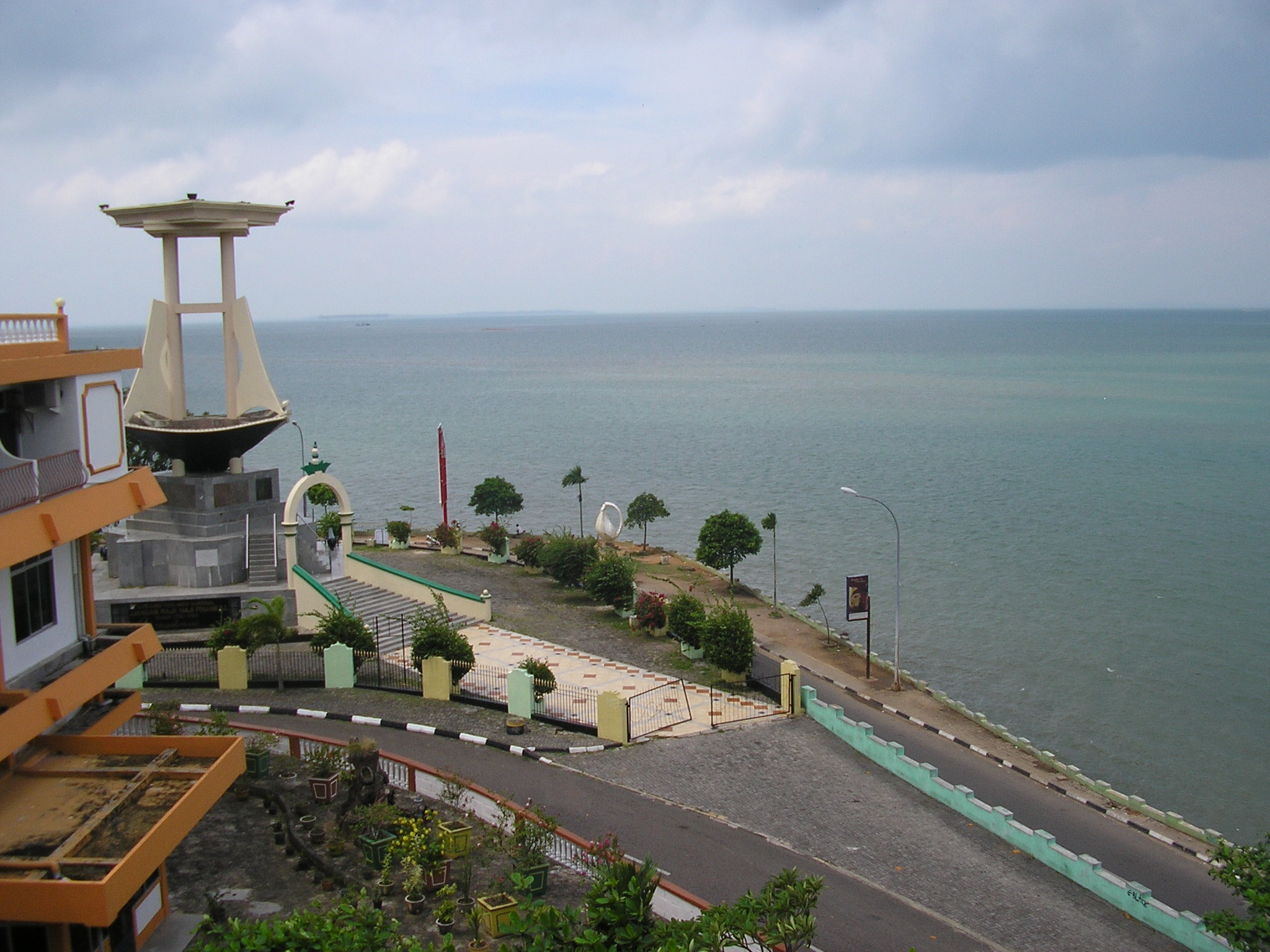
The Raja Haji Fisabillah Monument in Tanjungpinang

The cultural center for stage performances of Malay music and dances is located in Tanjungpinang. The centre regularly organises festivals and other performances, such as music and dance. Renowned Buddhist temples are located outside central Tanjungpinang in a region named Senggarang.

== Penyengat Island ==
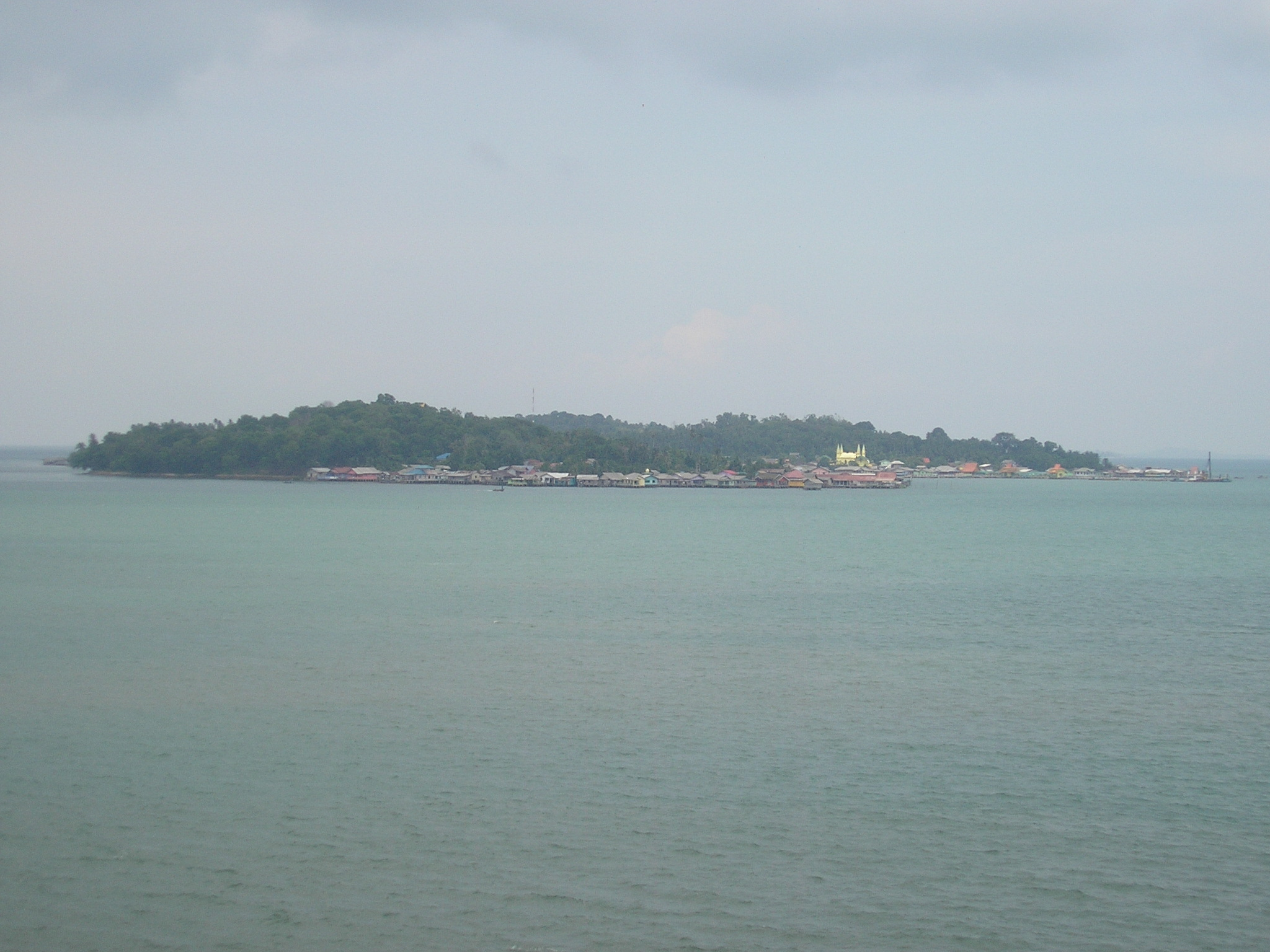
Penyengat Island

The old ruler's palace and royal tombs, including the grave of Raja Ali Haji (who was the creator and author of the first Malay grammar book), are one of the many legacies left by the Riau–Lingga Sultanate. The old vice-royal mosque, the Masjid Raya, is still in use.
