= Bintan Resorts =

Bintan Resorts is the name for a resort enclave occupying the northern area of Bintan Island in Indonesia. Established in 1990 as a joint venture between the Indonesian and Singaporean governments, it is located in the village of Sebong Lagoi in the district of Teluk Sebong, Bintan Regency. The enclave is operated by PT Bintan Resort Cakrawala.

Although the area is within Indonesian territory, Bintan Resorts is marketed at residents from nearby Singapore, for whom Bintan is a short ferry trip away. The area is generally a short-stay destination, with 90% of visitors staying less than seven days. The development received 410,454 visitors in 2009, of which the largest proportion, almost 30%, were Singaporean. Bintan welcomed a record-breaking one million visitors for the first time in 2018.

== Description ==
Bintan Resorts encompasses 18,000 hectares of land and has over a dozen hotels, serviced apartments, golf courses, restaurants, and parks.

Local hospitality company Nirwana Gardens operates five properties clustered in the northwesternmost part of the area: Nirwana Resort Hotel, Mayang Sari Beach Resort, Banyu Biru Villas, Indra Maya Pool Villas, and the now-closed Nirwana Beach Club. To the east of Nirwana Gardens is Laguna Bintan, a golf course with three hotels operated by Singaporean hospitality company Banyan Group: Banyan Tree Bintan, Angsana Bintan, and Cassia Bintan. Further east of Laguna Bintan is the Lagoi Bay public area, which includes Archipelago International's Kamuela Lagoi Bay Villas Bintan, Marriott International's Four Points by Sheraton Bintan Lagoi Bay, and the independently-operated The Sanchaya, Grand Lagoi Hotel Bintan, and Pantai Indah Lagoi Bintan. In 2017, IHG Hotels & Resorts signed a dual-branded Holiday Inn and Hotel Indigo resort complex to be built in Lagoi Bay. The project, following several delays, is currently on track for a 2025 opening.

The easternmost part of Bintan Resorts is occupied by the Ria Bintan Golf Club, complemented by two resorts, Club Med Ria Bintan and Bintan Lagoon Resort. The latter property, closed since the COVID-19 pandemic, has signed a management contract with Accor that will see it reopen under its Mövenpick brand. There was originally a third resort planned for this area, which would have been managed by Alila under its "Alila Villas" sub-brand, though the project has been stalled since it was announced in the early 2010s.

South of Nirwana Gardens and Laguna Bintan is Treasure Bay, a crystal lagoon billed as the largest swimming pool in Southeast Asia. It is surrounded by two resorts, both themed around glamping: ANMON, and Natra Bintan, the latter being a part of Marriott International's Tribute Portfolio collection. Retired ocean liner MV Doulos Phos, mounted on a piece of dry land to the west of Treasure Bay, was converted into a hotel in 2019. The far southern part of Bintan Resorts mainly houses accommodation for resort staff and management as well as a couple of schools, although it also hosts a 3-star hotel (d'primahotel Bintan) and a short-term rental (Bintan Services Apartment).

Prior to the development of Lagoi Bay, only hotel guests were allowed entry to Bintan Resorts. Even to this day, the area is still a gated community, with a fee charged for visitors.
