= Bintan Island =

Island in Bintan Regency, Riau Islands Province, Indonesia

Bintan
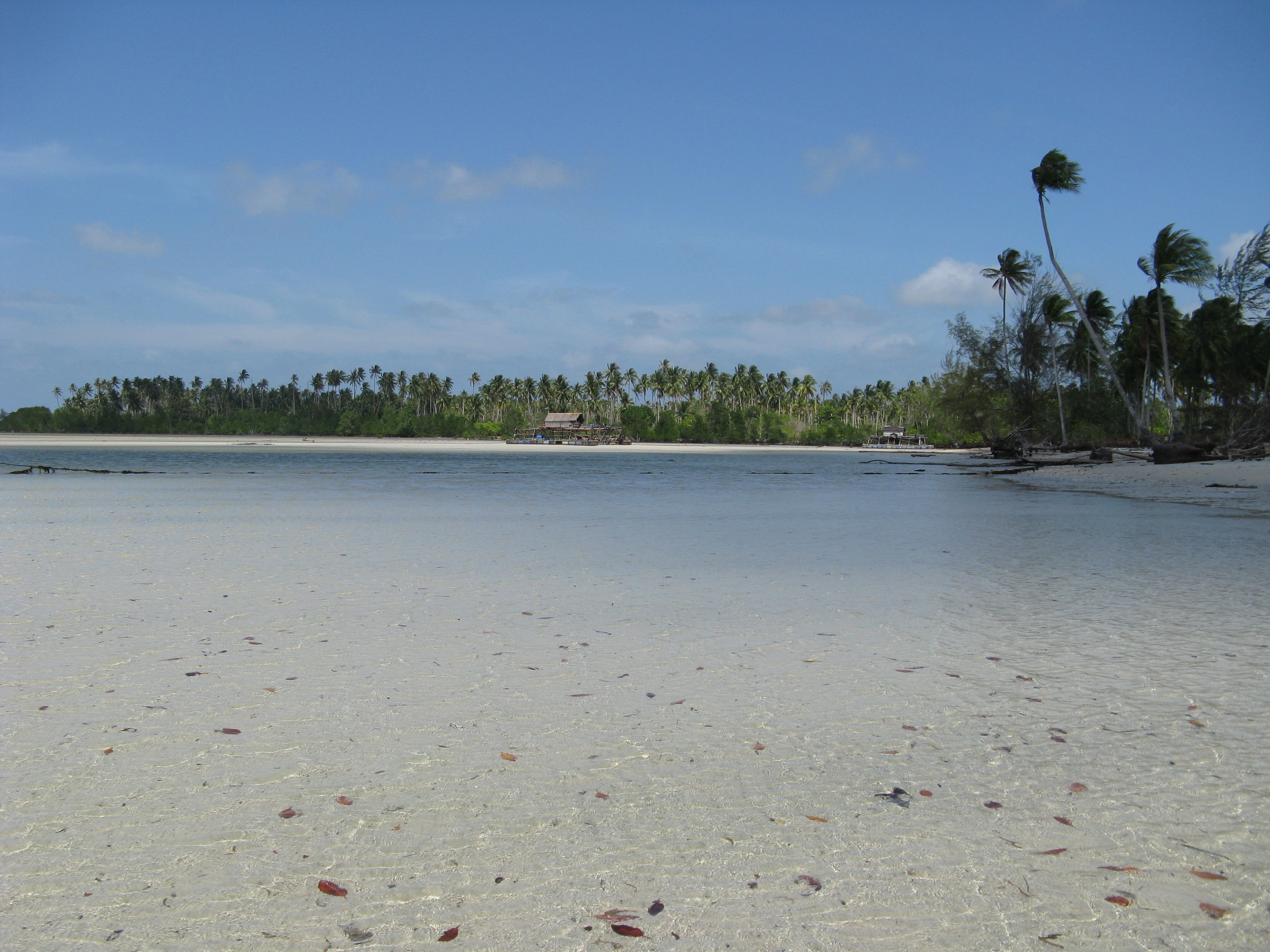
- Sumpat, Bintan Island in August 2007

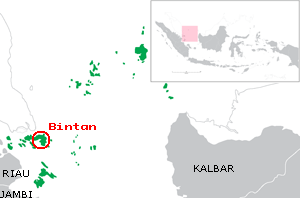
- Location of Bintan within Riau Islands

Geography
- Coordinates: 1°04′36″N 104°30′01″E
- Area: 1,170 km^{2} (450 sq mi)
- Highest point: Mount Bintan Besar (360 m)

Administration
- Indonesia
- Province: Riau Islands
- Largest settlement: Tanjungpinang (pop. 233,367)

Demographics
- Population: 387,181 (2020)
- Pop. density: 139.39/km^{2} (361.02/sq mi)

Additional information
- Time zone: IWST (UTC+07:00)

Bintan Island, traditionally known as Negeri Segantang Lada, is an island in the Riau archipelago of Indonesia. It is part of the Riau Islands province, the capital of which, Tanjung Pinang, lies in the island's south and is the island's main community.

The land area of the island of Bintan is roughly 1,170 square kilometres (450 mi^{2}). Its administrative region is designated the Bintan Regency, one of the six administrative regencies of the Riau Islands province. The city of Tanjung Pinang is an autonomous area geographically within Bintan Island but not included in the Regency.

Bintan's history is traced to the early 3rd century. The island flourished as a trading post on the route between China and India, and over the centuries it came under the control of the Chinese, the British, and then the Dutch when it was declared part of the Dutch East Indies through the Anglo–Dutch Treaty of 1824, which divided the British and Dutch spheres of influence. In the 12th century, the Bintan island in the Strait of Malacca was known as the "Pirate Island" since the Malay pirates used to loot trading ships sailing in these waters.

Singapore, the closest major city, is roughly an hour trip by motorised ferry across the Singapore Strait from the Bintan Resort area in the northwest of the island. The island is predominantly rural, but has beaches with beach-front hotels and resorts; the most prominent of these beaches is the Bintan Resorts set over an area of 300 hectares (740 acres) of tropical environment. The archipelago of the Riau islands is right opposite to this resort across the South China Sea. Indonesia is promoting Bintan as the next best tourist destination after Bali.

== History ==
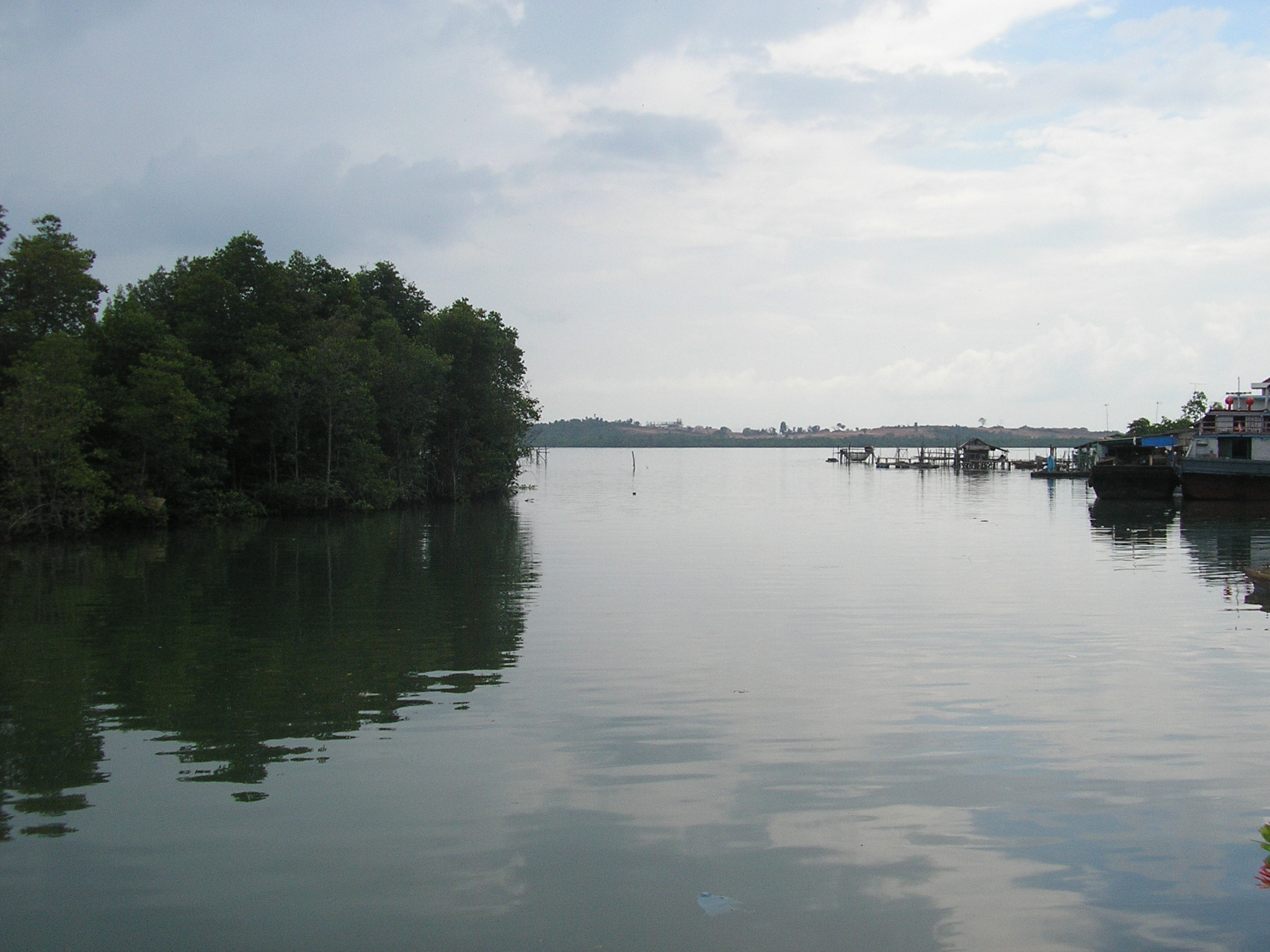
Tanjung Pinang in Bintan

On account of Bintan Island's strategic location and size on the India-China trade route, it has a rich history. Along with the local ethnic Malays and the Bugis, domination by the Portuguese, the Dutch, the Arabs, and the British at different times have been a part of Bintan's rich history. Many local internal feuds between the Malays and Bugis, and battles in the sea, with and between foreign invasion forces, have been part of Bintan's history and its straits. From the mid-16th century, the Sultan of Johor-Riau kingdom had moved their kingdom between Johor, Riau and Lingga.

The earliest history of Bintan is linked to the history of Nagoya Hills, which is integral with Batam, near Bintan island and other islands of the Riau archipelago. The Chinese chronicles have mentioned that Batam was inhabited by 231 AD when Singapore island was still called Pulau Ujung (Ujung Island). Bintan came under the control of the Malacca kingdom from the 13th century. Later, the Sultan of Johor ruled from here and his reign lasted till the 18th century.

Riau Islands were central to the greater Malay kingdoms or Sultanates, known as the 'Malay World', which had its control from eastern Sumatra to Borneo. For centuries, Riau was the home of Malay and Orang Laut people. They had settled in Bintan. These two communities were the backbone of most Malay kingdoms from the time of Srivijaya to the Sultanate of Johor. They had full control of trade routes going through the straits. Migrants from China and Indo-China, though came here later, settled in large area of Asia. After the fall of Melaka in 1511, Riau islands became the centre of political power of the mighty Sultanate of Johor or Johor – Riau, based on Bintan island. They were considered the centre of Malay culture.

From the 12th to 13th centuries, the Srivijaya Empire of Sumatra held sway over Bintan island. Sri Tri Buana, a member of the royal family of Palembang, had visited Riau Islands in 1290. Permaisuri Iskandar Syah, the Queen of the Kingdom of Bentan on Bintan Island, met him and made a strategic alliance. They moved with a "flotilla of 800 vessels to Bintan" where Sri Tri Buana became the king. However, Bintan and its straits got the reputation as a pirate island due to the Malay pirates who seized many ships by forcing them to the port to trade and or loot the cargo carried by them. Hundreds of ships of Malays forced Chinese ships returning from the Indian Ocean to their ports in Bintan. Those who resisted were attacked. Large quantities of Chinese ceramics were recovered on Bintan, some traced to the early Song dynasty (960–1127). The Arabian chronicler, Ibn Battuta, writing on the Riau islands in the 13th century states: "Here there are little islands, from which armed black pirates with poised arrows emerged, possessing armed warships; they plunder people but do not enslave them." Log records of Chinese ships testify these incidents in the 12th century. Even after several centuries, Bintan is still referred by many by the epithet "Pirate Island".

According to historical records, Sri Tri Bhuvana occupied Singapore and then declared himself as the King of Singapore. Before that he renamed Temasek, the island he had occupied, as Singapore. Another explanation mooted to the naming of Singapore is that the king spotted an animal, which he presumed to be a lion, and hence called Temasek as Singapore (Lion City). The reign of Srivijaya empire lasted till the 16th century.

In the year 1521, the Portuguese who were on pepper hunt, had the intention of building strongholds in the form of forts during their sea voyages in the East, on Sunda Island in Java after they had received instructions from their King to destroy four forts in India, Sri Lanka and Sumatra. However, they initially failed to capture Bentan, the stronghold of the former Sultan of Malaca on the south east of the Singapore Strait and Atjeh (the capital of a new Sultanate, which was emerging in North Sumatra). At this time, they were successful in establishing a fort at Pasai though were unsuccessful in establishing a fortress at Canton in China and suffered defeat at the hands of the Chinese. In 1524, Malays of Bintan attacked Malacca, which was under the control of the Portuguese.

Bintan first became politically important when Sultan Mahmud of the fallen Sultanate of Malacca fled to Bintan and created a resistance base there after Malacca was taken by the Portuguese forces in 1511. The Portuguese eventually destroyed the stronghold in 1526, and after a few years the Sultanate founded a new capital back on the Malay Peninsula and developed from there.

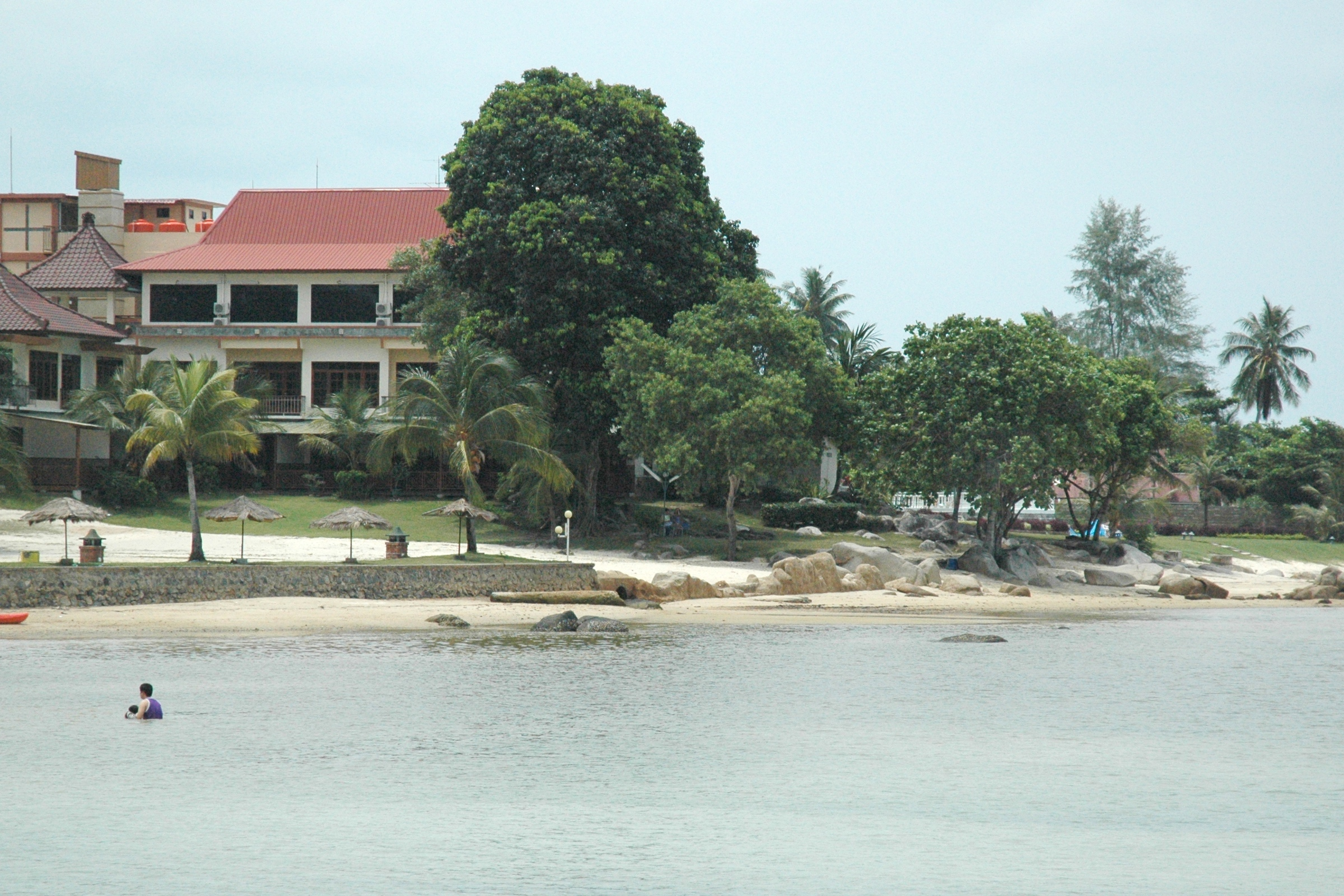
Bintan agro beach resort

At the beginning of the 18th century, the Sultanate of Johor entered into political turmoil and the capital moved back to Bintan as the Bugis took control of the Sultanate. At the hands of the Bugis, Bintan became a powerful trading port, attracting regional, Western, Indian and Chinese traders as well as migrants including Chinese much in the same way Malacca had developed into a regional power three centuries earlier.

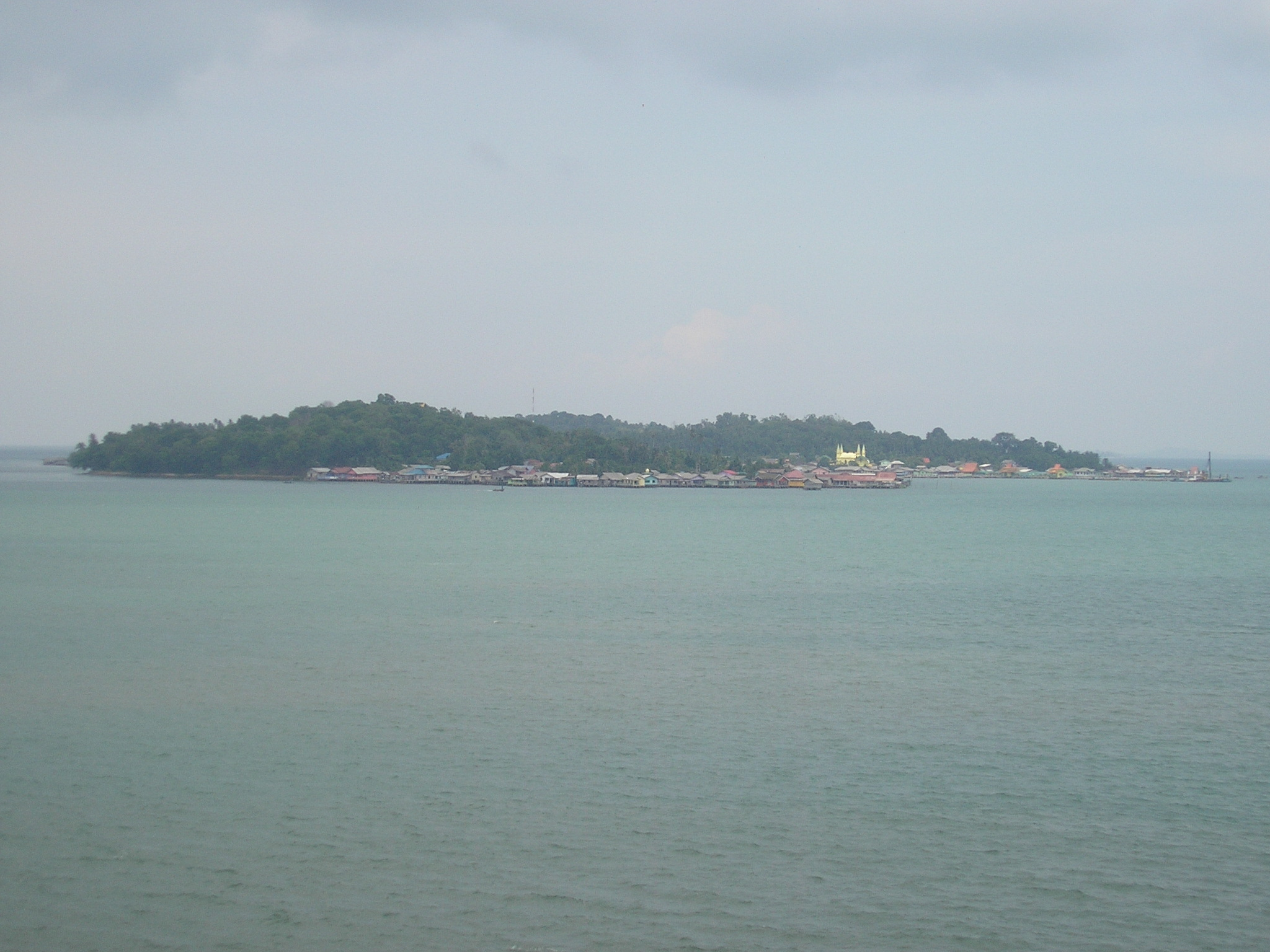
Penyengat Island in Bintan

European powers wanted to take control of the port, which had a flourishing trade. During this period the British, who controlled Penang, were aggressively looking towards expanding their control to the south of the Straits of Malacca, as they wished to contain the Dutch expansions. They considered Bintan as a possible location. During this period the Dutch had defeated the Bintan rulers and taken control of the island by the end of the 18th century; this had brought to an end the local trading supremacy. This also resulted in checkmating the British ambition to occupy the area. However, an internal power struggle within the Sultanate of Riau-Johor ensued. The British seized this opportunity and occupied the island of Singapore. With this, the importance of Bintan island as a trading port also declined. A new cultural centre developed on Penyengat Island and it got established as the stronghold of Malay and Islamic culture.

However the history changed the fate of Riau as a political, cultural or economic centre when European powers took control of the regional trade routes by taking advantage of political weaknesses within the Sultanate. Singapore Island, that had been for centuries part of the same greater Malay kingdoms and sultanates, and under direct control of Sultan of Johor, came under British control. The creation of a European-controlled territory in Johor-Riau heart broke the sultanate into two parts, destroying the cultural and political unity that had existed for centuries.

The Anglo-Dutch treaty of 1824 consolidated this separation, with the British controlling all territories north of the Singapore Strait and Dutch controlling territories from Riau to Java. Till the independence of Indonesia in 1945, Bintan was under the control of the Netherlands East Indies. However, the Riau Archipelago remained a fairly borderless territory till recently. During the World War II Japanese had occupied the Malay world and Singapore was their headquarters. During this period, many Malays including the upper strata of society had to join the Imperial Army. After the war, from 1950 the Archipelago was a duty-free zone till the revolution Konfrontasi in 1963. During this period, the Straight dollar of British Malaya was the principal currency. Visa free movement of people, which existed then is now no more prevalent.

== Geography and climate ==
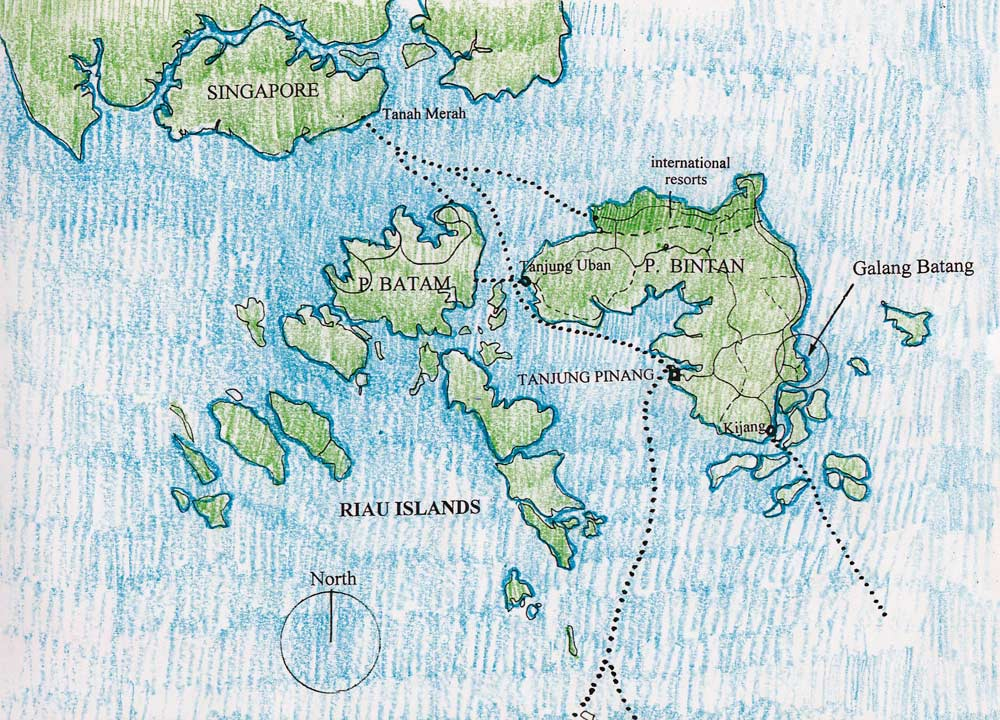
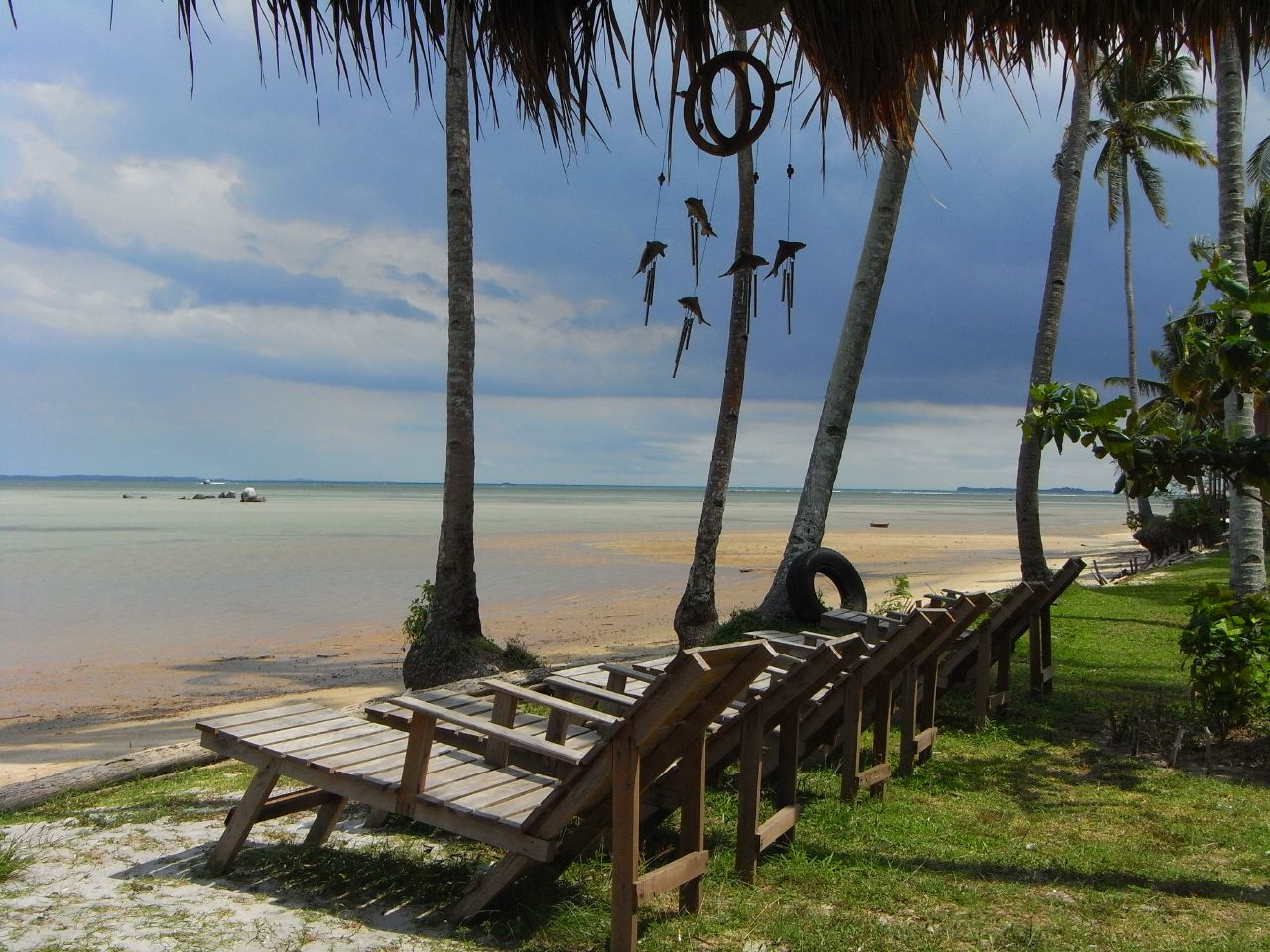
Left: Bintan Island Map. Right: Bintan's coast on the South China Sea

Bintan, is the largest among the 3,200 islands of Riau Archipelago and is located 10 kilometres (6.2 mi) east of the Batam Island. It has a coast line of 105 kilometres (65 mi) and has rolling topography in its landform. The Riau Islands are a province of Indonesia, which encompassed the Riau Archipelago, Natuna Islands, Anambas, and Lingga Islands; in July 2004 the islands of Riau were divided from the existing Riau Province to form the new province with its capital at Tanjung Pinang. The archipelagos of Anambas and Natuna, located between mainland Malaysia and Borneo, are now part of this province

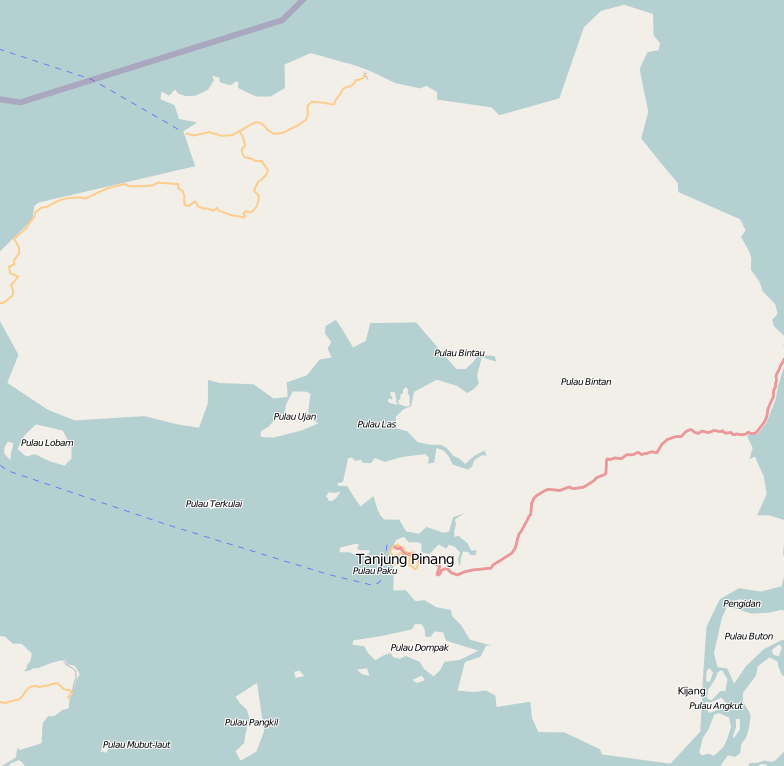
Map of Bintan

In the Tanjung Pinang city, the low tide reach or the mud flat part was built with stilts and were mosquito and rat infested. Above these mud flat reaches, narrow piers or pelantars were built at higher elevations and the old city of Tanjung expanded with a maze of streets and alleys. The old pier with the name Pelantar II thrives as the fish market. The town has a large population of the Chinese, whose presence is seen around three Buddhist Pagodas with the 'Citiya Bodhi Sasana' overlooking the ocean at the end of Pelantar II pier.

The Indonesian sea route through the Bintan straits has been considered very safe for sailing of small freighters. The island has developed over the centuries in two distinct zones, namely, the southern and the northern zones, which are clearly differentiated from the prevalent life styles of people living there.

The highest hill on the island is Bintan Besar, which is 360 metres (1,180 ft) in height and has thick forest cover. It is formed by old volcanic eruptions. The summit of this peak can be reached through a forest track and the climb takes about 3 hours. The top of this peak provides a panoramic view of Bintan. It is approached from a hamlet at the foot of the hill, known as Kampung Sekuning, which is 60 kilometres (37 mi) from Tanjung Pinang. Despite being larger than Batam, it is less populated.

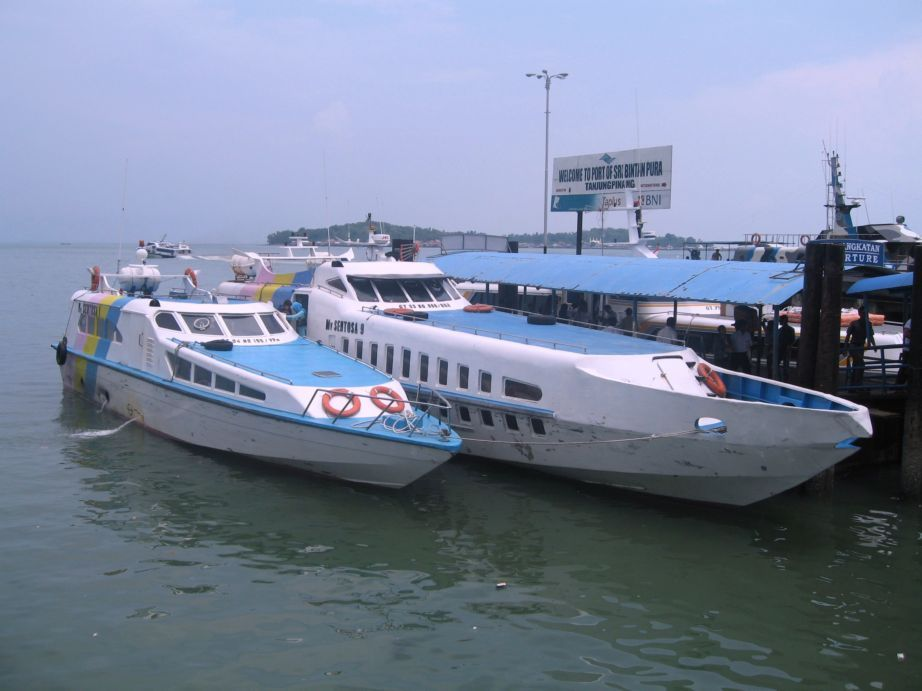
Bintan ferry terminal

Several daily ferries run between Tanah Merah Ferry Terminal of Singapore to the Bandar Bentan Telani Ferry Terminal on the northern part of the Island in Bintan resorts and also at the Sri Bintan Pura Ferry Terminal at Tanjung Pinang, the capital of the Indonesian province of Riau Islands covering a distance of 45 kilometres (28 mi) in about 45 minutes. The airport is domestic only (no international flights) - Bintan's Raja Haji Fisabilillah Airport (IATA: TNJ, ICAO: WIDN).

Bintan is very close to the Equator. Hence, tropical climate is dominant all through the year with two distinct seasons namely the northeast monsoon from November to March and a dry southwest monsoon from June to October with the annual rainfall precipitation incidence varying in the range 2,500–3,000 millimetres (98–118 in). The island has an "insular character" with a constant temperature averaging at 26 °C (79 °F). The temperatures reported vary between 21 °C (70 °F) and 32 °C (90 °F). March to early November is the dry and the quiet season with clear sunny days. Winter season lasts from late November to March.

== Demographics ==
Though a large island compared to all other islands in the Riau archipelago, it is sparsely populated. As the Dutch ruled over the islands for a long period, their influence is distinctly discerned in the island. The population of Bintan Island is about 371,270 in 2020 (excluding the population of neighbouring island groups lying within Bintan Regency), with the citizens mostly belonging to the Malay, Bugis, Chinese and the Orang Laut ethnicity. An observation made on the distribution of different ethnic groups in Bintan is that Indonesians have migrated in large numbers to the island and as result Malays, the original settlers of the region, are now a minority in Riau Archipelago as a whole. This is attributed to the fact that the island is close to Malaysia and Singapore in particular and Indonesians flock to the place to get a foothold to go to Singapore. In the capital city of Tanjung Pinang, the urban population had jumped from 98,871 in 1998 to 187,359 in 2010, and by 2020 had reached 227,663.

== Economy and development ==
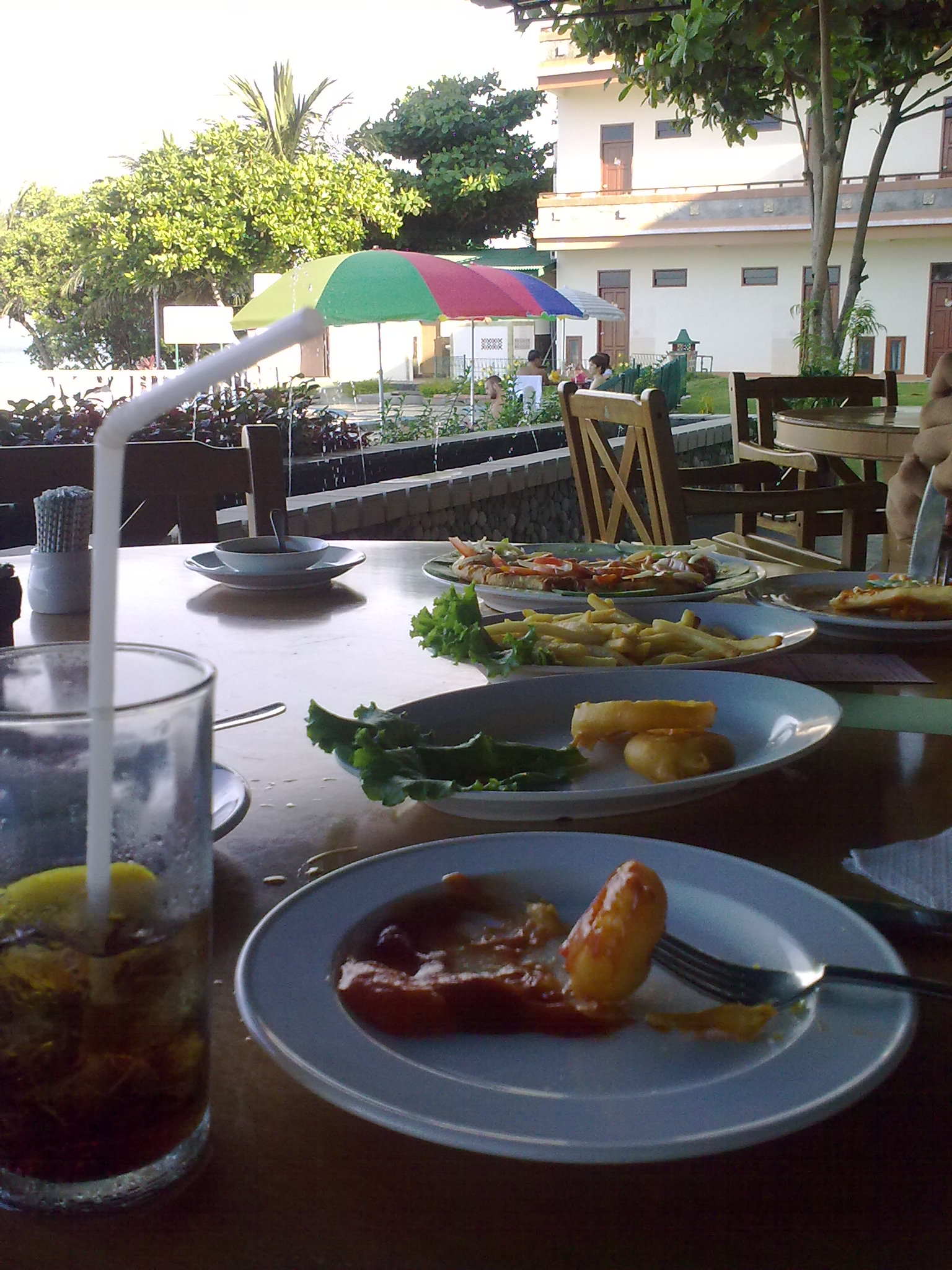
Bintan Agro Beach Resort

In 1824, the Treaty of London finally settled that the islands south of Singapore are Dutch Territories. Bintan was again under the control of the Dutch. Bintan's power and central role disappeared with the regional political changes and the island's past fortune was now overshadowed by neighbouring Batam and Singapore. Following its founding by the British in 1819, Singapore became a new regional trading centre. Due to its limited size, Singapore initiated the Sijori Growth Triangle in 1980 and 1990s, and signed agreements with the Indonesian government to invest in Batam and Bintan.

The economy of Bintan island is centred on tourism, given its close proximity to Singapore. In the year 1990, according to a Presidential Decree (25 July 1990), a coordinating team was set up for the Riau Province Development with the mandate to plan and develop development projects within the framework of Indonesia-Singapore cooperation. Investment plans, similar to that of Batam, were evolved with basic intention to provide leisure space to Singaporeans on the white beaches of Bintan and this approach also conformed to the Indonesian Policy of declaring the 1990s as the "decade of Visit Indonesia". In 1991, Bintan Management Resort for establishing a resort with intent to develop resorts, industrial parks and water projects was planned. In December 1994, partial opening of Bintan Resort Development was agreed under a Memorandum of Understanding signed by trade ministers of Singapore, Malaysia and Indonesia. As per the Master Plan prepared for Bintan, the emphasis was on tourism, industrial projects and agricultural products, all under private-sector initiative, involving formation of a consortium of the Singapore Technologies Industrial Corporation, Wah Chang International (whose specialisation is development of resorts), the Keppel group and the local banks. Thus, the once wild and deserted Bintan island has now become an industrial "hinterland" for Singapore and a special investment zone for world industrial companies, also attracting thousands of workers from the entire country. This industrial estate agreement is in partnership with Batamlndo Industrial Park. The Bintan industrial estate has been allotted 4,000 hectares (9,900 acres) and is designed as a "One-stop investment centre" providing all services essential for the investing companies to devote exclusively towards production. It targets industries such as textiles, garments and wood processing, unlike the Batam industrial estates. This functions as a supplement to Singapore's economy by way of manufacturing low-value goods here.

Earlier, Singapore's Batam Industrial Park had signed an agreement with Indonesia to lease its northern coast and develop it into a resort ("Bintan Resort") for Singaporeans. An area of 23,000 hectares (57,000 acres) had been allocated to this project, which was further divided to 20–30 projects – 3,000 hectares (7,400 acres) for hotels and resorts and sports facilities. Further, the Bintan Lagoon and Beach Resorts, designed exclusively for wealthy tourists, have been planned with "two 18-hole championship golf courses with superlative accommodation". This resort area has an exclusive approach from Singapore that bypasses the capital city. It has modern facilities of museums, handicraft shops, artists' villages and other eco-tourism related attractions.

The agribusiness venture planned under the Master Plan for Bintan envisages pig rearing for export to Singapore and seafood processing plants. Fishery cultivation of grouper fish, Napoleon, kakap and bream are also planned in the island.

Under the industrial sector, the identified fields for development are mining of Bauxite (Bauxite reserve is 15.88 million tons), kaolin, granite, white sand and tin. The government of Indonesia has also planned the petroleum industry with its subsidiary industry of manufacture of plastics in Bintan.

Bintan Eco-Tourism Venture Project has been launched to generate better income avenues for the low-income families. The eco-tourism destinations identified are all within approachable distances that could be covered in about 30 to 90 minutes from the starting point by car. Village handicrafts made from the local pandanus plants are a popular attraction during the eco-tour to villages in Bintan. Private operators are meanwhile succeeding in putting Bintan on the world map for Eco-tourism, with both Nikoi and LooLa Adventure Resort being amongst the four finalists of WildAsia's highly respected 2012 award for "Asia's most inspiring responsible tourism operators", which LooLa went on to win. LooLa furthermore is one of three finalists in the 2013 WTTC's "Tourism for tomorrow, community benefits" awards. In 2016, newly opened Cempedak cemented the island's aspirations as a sustainability hero by winning the award for Sustainable Design in the HICAP 2017 Sustainable Hotel Awards.

The Integrated resort management is highly dependent on the International tourism industry. Tourist footfalls, as recorded till 2016, have been reported to be on the increase and reached over 600,000 just to the Bintan Resorts area.

Thus, the massive and ambitious economic development plan envisaging "10 golf courses, 20 hotels, 10 condominiums, three village clusters, a township, several marine and eco-tourism attractions" launched in 1995 with a gestation period of 20 years, was according to the leisure industry analyst of Singapore: "Bintan has better prospects because of the people behind its development. They are big names who will have to maintain their reputation. But there have been some delays in the construction of the Bintan Lagoi residential area.

In 2016, over 600,000 tourists visited Bintan Island and most of them came from Singapore, Korea and Japan. 75 percent of foreign tourists came by ferry from Singapore, while domestic tourists mainly came by airplanes to the recently opened Raja Haji Fisabilillah Airport 35 minutes from Bintan Resort, whereas the current Tanjung Pinang airport is 90 minutes away.

== Water resources ==
Water resources of the Bintan have been exclusively planned by identifying an area of 43,000 hectares (110,000 acres) for the purpose which also includes the catchment of the water source and its forest areas.

== Infrastructure ==
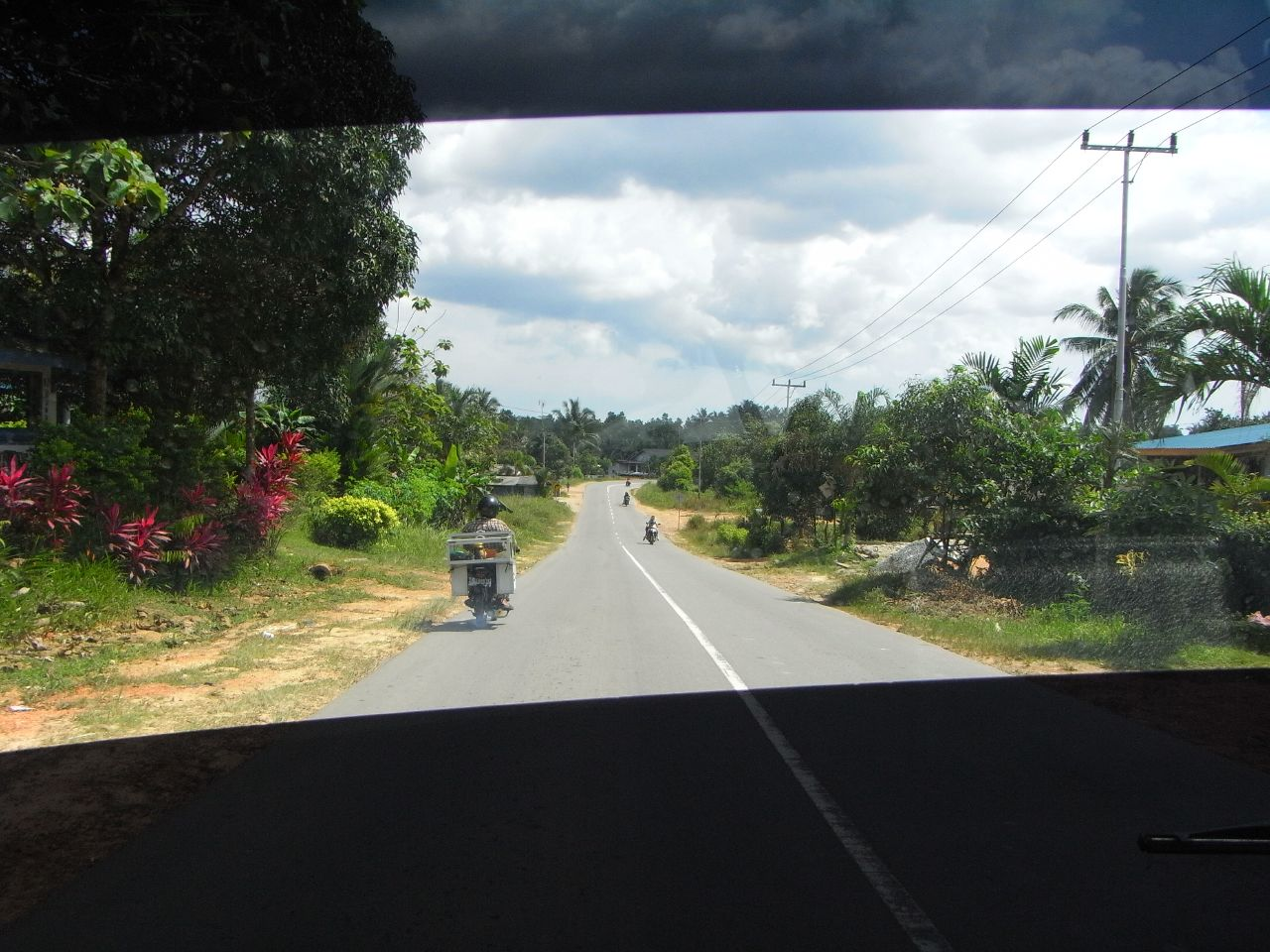
Main road leading to Bintan Resort

To meet the large developmental programme launched for the Bintan island, creation of modern infrastructure facilities began in 1991 itself with an investment of US$170 million. Since the island was approachable only by ferrying, priority was given to develop the Ferry terminal at Bandar Bentan Telani. There are now three Ferry Terminals (Sea Ports) and two Cargo Sea Ports with capacity of 10,000 to 12000 gross weight ton. Bintan now has an airport known as Raja Haji Fisabilillah Airport. Garuda Indonesia has plans to build a new airport hub on the island as a stop gap measure for Jakarta, and to compete with Lion Air's new hub at Hang Nadim International Airport on neighboring Batam. One issue however is the region is saturated with airport capacity while land is scarce, as Singapore Changi Airport and Johor Bahru Senai International Airport are nearby.

Road within the island was also started and the first stretch of the 12.5 kilometres (7.8 mi), the east west arterial road was completed (out of the 35 kilometres (22 mi) stretch planned in the ultimate stage). Branch roads were also built to land parcels allotted for resort development. There is also road connections to nearby towns such as Kijang. Within each land area allocated, the resort agencies constructed their own internal road network. Drinking water facilities were also created by constructing a reservoir of 5 million litres and a service reservoir of 1.5 million litres for supply to a water treatment plant. From this plant, potable water supply system has been created to all the resort areas. Electricity supply is also ensured through a Power generating plant of 18 MW plant with capacity to upgrade to 24 MW. Within each resort area water and power supply connections to the resorts are done by the resort agencies. The potable water that is supplied meets the WHO standards. Sewage Treatment is done in all the resorts through modular Sewage treatment plants. The recycled effluent is put to use for irrigation. Another important civic amenity attended is the disposal of solid waste. The solid waste is collected from the resorts. It is systematically disposed in a centralized sanitary landfill site. There are 15 banks, 7 hotels and 6 golf courses. Telecommunication Service facility available is the International Net Work.

== Flora and fauna ==
=== Flora ===
In Bintan, the primary forest cover was in a limited area on the hills. There was extensive deforestation done mostly for the cultivation of gambier (Uncaria gembieri). The plantation size of each gambier plantation was 30 hectares (74 acres). For processing of gambier leaves firewood was essential. This requirement was met by cutting forests of as much as the 30 hectares (74 acres) sized gambier plantations. With this amount of forest degradation, the gambier processing could be sustained for 12 years only. Forest was not available for use for the processing, and production of gambier was discontinued, while efforts continued to find new stocks of firewood. Inevitably, Gambier was totally abandoned. In the 20th century rubber plantation replaced gambier. Even the rubber plantations were abandoned due to water logging problems. Now, on the higher reaches of the hills secondary forests have developed in those areas where water logging is not prevalent. The abandoned land is also now put to other uses. In the rain forests of the island on the trek to the Gunung Bintan peak, now vegetation consists of 40 metres (130 ft) tall trees of dipterocarp (which bears two winged fruits) and many other plants.

=== Fauna ===
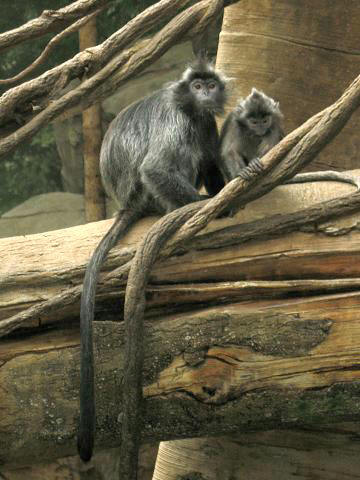
Silver leaf monkeys

Various species of sea animals and plants are found underwater. From squids to snails, from various fish to oyster – several marine species including sea turtles are found here. Dolphins are also sighted. The variety and diversity of sea life is very attractive. Wild animals seen on this forest trek are silver leaf monkeys, sunbirds, eagles and kites.

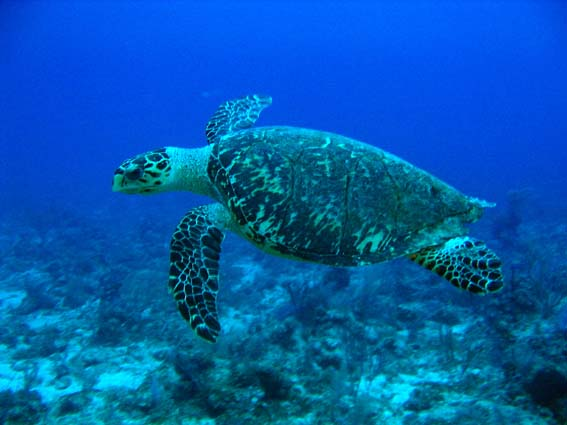
Hawksbill turtle

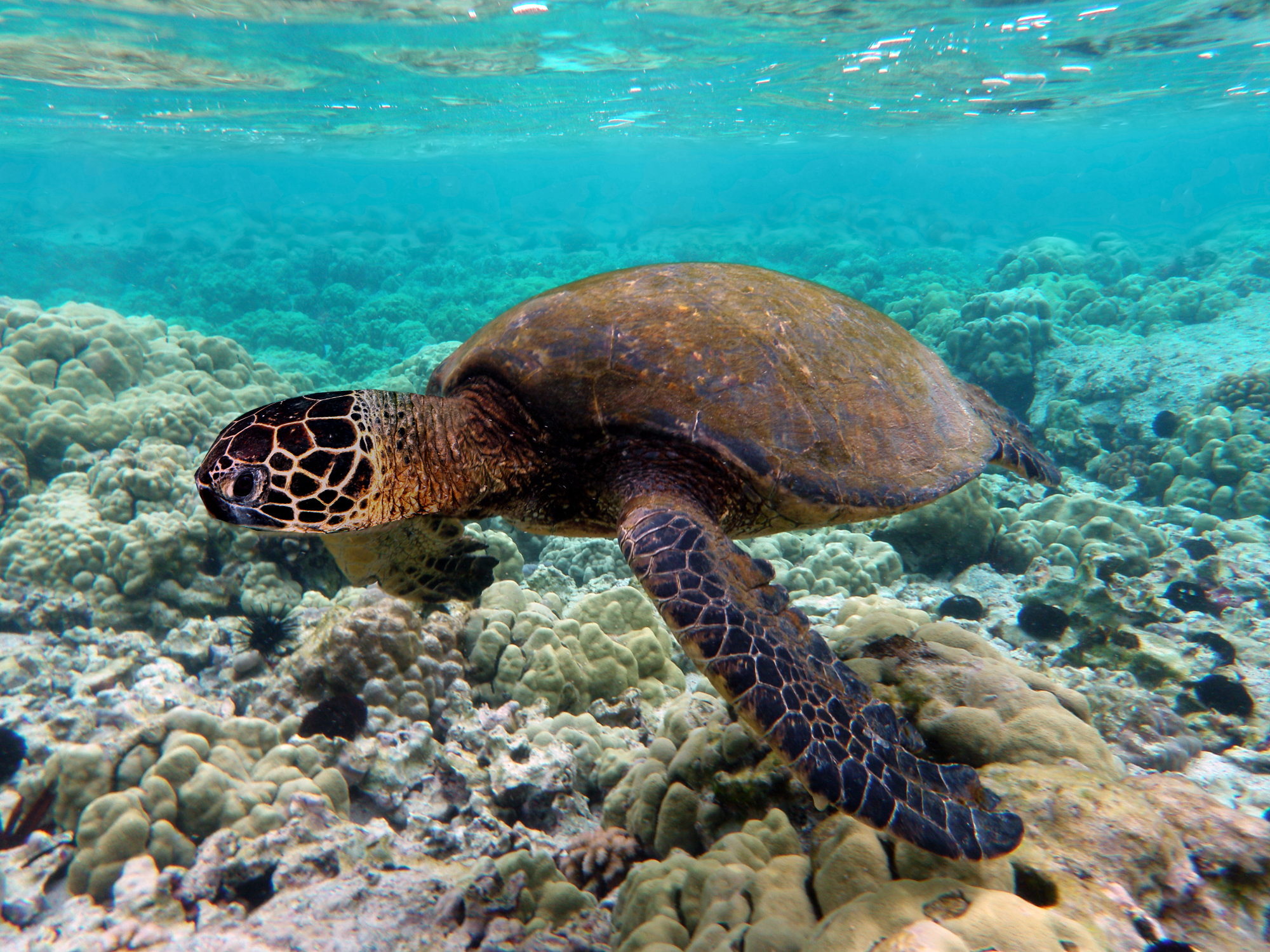
Green turtle

Sea turtles

Sea turtles, in particular, are the special species of Indonesia and its many islands, including Bintan; six species out of seven found in the world are recorded in Indonesia. The Indonesian law protection Act. no. 5 1990 re Conservation of Nature Resource and its Ecosystem; Government Regulation no. 7 1990 re Conservation Species of Flora & Fauna and the international trade by CITES (Convention of International Trade on Endangered Species) provide protection to these species.

Bintan Island was one of the locations where turtles were found in large numbers; in the 1950s, during the nesting season, at least 2 nests used to be found every day on the coastline of Bintan Resorts. Now, the nests are not found as frequently as in the past. Turtle tracks, nests, eggs, and egg shells have been recorded during patrol surveys conducted during specified periods, not only in Bintan but also in the Pasir Pasan beach. In the Bintan Resort's nestling beaches hawksbill turtle (Eretmochelys imbricata) and green turtles (Chelonia mydas) have been recorded. Research and Development Department and Environmental & Health Division of Bintan Resort are encouraged by their patrolling efforts and they are confident that sea turtle nests would be protected on Bintan and also conserved in local villages.

== Historical places ==
At Bintan and in its close vicinity of its capital city of Tanjung Pinang, there are a number of historical monuments linked to its ancient history and modern developments. Its closeness to Singapore has resulted in development of beaches as popular resorts with hotels and other paraphernalia to attract tourists. Some of the well-known sites of attractions are the Penyengat, Tanjung Pinang city, Raja Ali Haji Monument, the Colonial Graveyard, Chinese Pagodas, Banyan Tree Temple, and its many beaches and resorts. Natural Maritime Culture is also part of the historical nature's heritage of mangroves, many species of animals and birds and the rich and exotic maritime nature of the sea life.

=== Penyengat ===
Penyengat is a historical small island (about 2.5 square kilometres (0.97 mi^{2}) in area) located about 6 kilometres (3.7 mi) offshore of Tanjung Pinang, which was a religious, cultural and administrative centre of the region in the 19th century of the Riau-Johor sultanate. The Sultan had shifted to this place after Melaka was taken over by the Portuguese and he made it the capital of his kingdom, which was in decline at the time. On the northeast end of the island many ancient Islamic relics are seen. The Malay and the Bugis, to attain peace in the region, had cemented their relationship by establishing marital ties. Raja Ali Haji, who was the Bugis commander of Bintan and acclaimed as the hero of his people, married his daughter to Sultan Mahmud Shah of Malacca. The island was gifted to his daughter, Raja Hamidah. This union established peace between the Malay and the Bugis. Following this, a grand mosque (see infobox) called the Masjid Raya was built on the island (over 170 years old), which can be seen from Tanjung Pinang. A monument by the seaside that commemorates Raja Ali Haji, who sacrificed his life for his people against the Dutch, is also seen on the beach. Hakka ethnic people and Indo-Malays reside here. Another historical fact is that in 1819 the Penyangat-based sultanate cooperated with Sir Stamford Raffles to handover Singapore in exchange for British Military protection.

Masjid Raya Sultan Riau

Mosque in Tanjung Pinang, the capital city of the province of Riau Islands.

Masjid Raya Sultan Riau built in 1818, is an exquisitely kept yellow mosque, also called the sulfur-coloured mosque. It has many domes and minarets. The unique feature of the mosque is that the mortar used was the special egg-white mortar as the cementing material; eggs were presented to the Sultan by his subjects on the occasion of his wedding. The mosque houses a rare 150-year-old hand written Koran in its Islamic library. A formal dress code is observed for entry into the mosque.

=== Tanjung Pinang ===
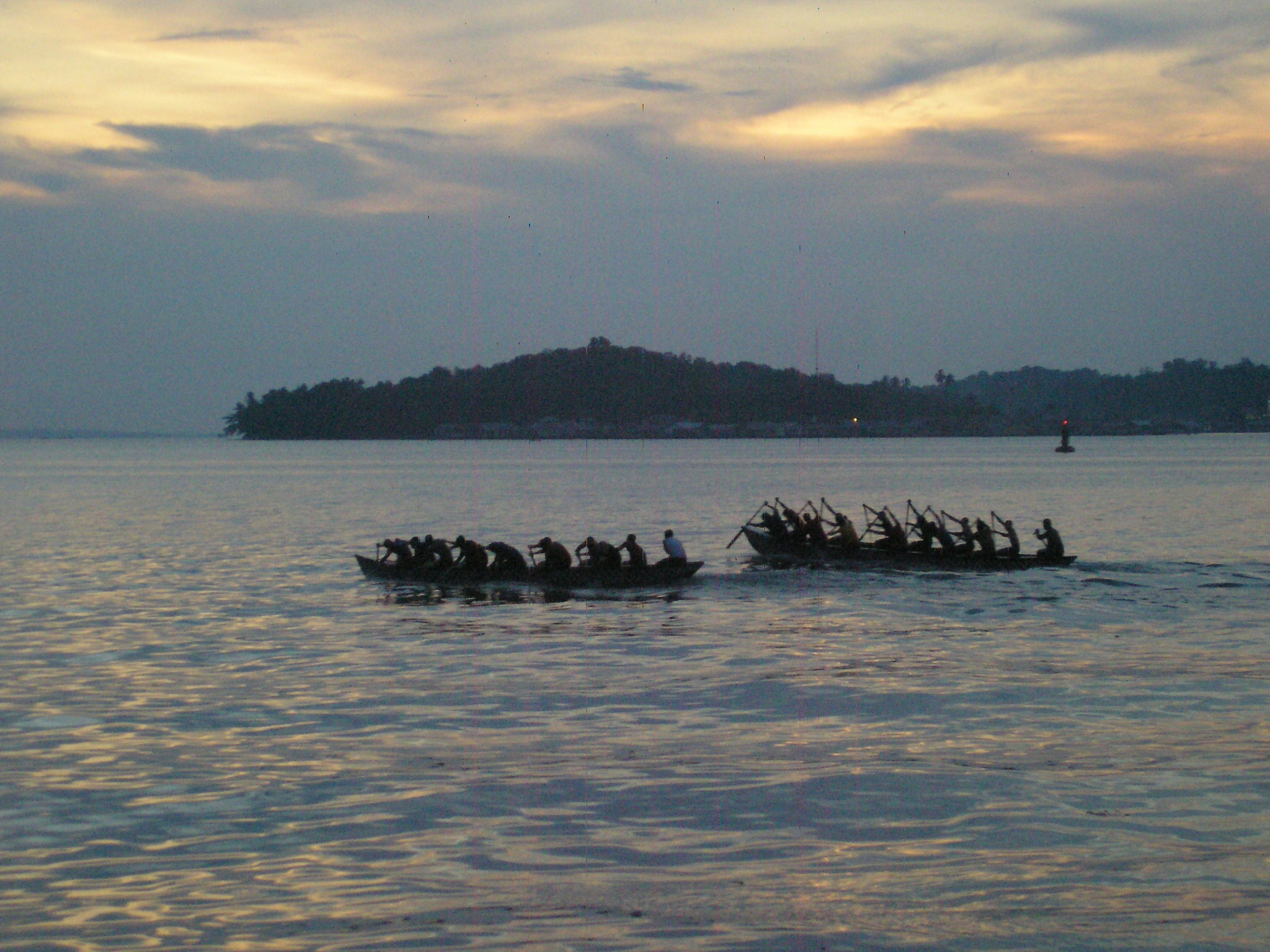
Boat race in Tanjungpinang

Tanjungpinang is located on the southwestern part of Bintan island and is the capital and largest town of the Indonesian province of Riau Islands. It is a port town and a trade centre with ethnic diversity and with traditional villages and temples. It has an area of 13,600 hectares (34,000 acres) and is an autonomous region within the Bintan Island. It is a trading port between islands in the Riau archipelago. Tanjungpinang has ferry and speedboat connections to Batam, Singapore, and Johor Bahru. The city is the backyard for the Singaporeans to get away from their sanitized city to indulge in a spot of anarchy

"a bit of littering here, a touch of smoking in public places there and a lot of shopping between the two. Prices for things like exotic fruits and dried assorted seaweeds are less than in Singapore so some bargain hunting can be combined with a weekend away".

In the central commercial district there is a small Chinese temple in the interior of the old town at Lorong Gambir II, called the Cetiya Satya Dharma.

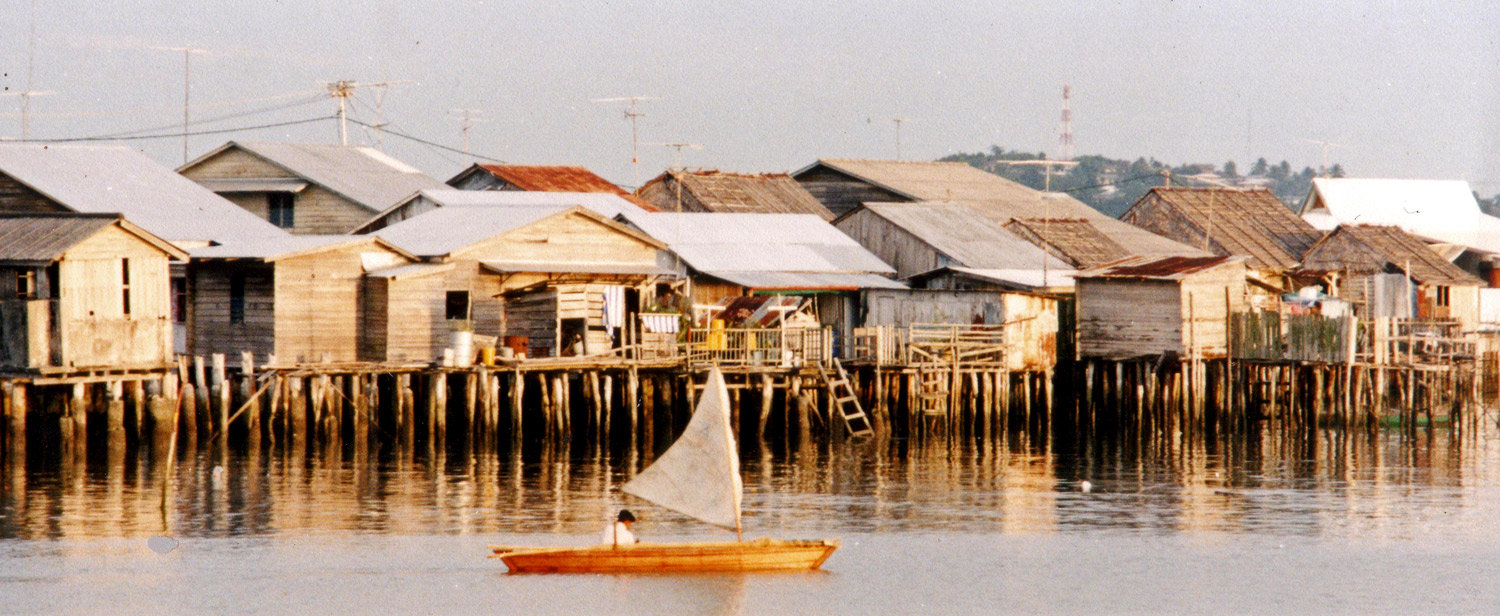
The village of Senggarang near Tanjungpinang

Within the town of Tanjungpinang, there is a Dutch Colonial Graveyard (mostly in ruins), which reflects the life of the seamen (Europeans) in the old days. The town also has a museum at the crossing of the Jalan Kamboja road with Jalan Bakar batu. The museum has display of many eccentric historical artifacts, ceramics, kris and guns. It is a culturally happening place with cultural centres for stage performances of Malay music and dance festivals. Renowned Buddhist temples are located outside central Tanjungpinang in a small town named Senggarang. A Palace and royal tombs, among them the grave of the Raja Ali Haji's and also tombs of other royals, are located here. The old ruler was the creator and author of the first Malay Language grammar book, which is a rich legacy of the Riau sultanate. Another vintage site of interest is the "Old Stilt" village (in the mud flat low tide region near the jetties), known as "Tanjungpinang's Kampung ayer or Kampung Bugis".

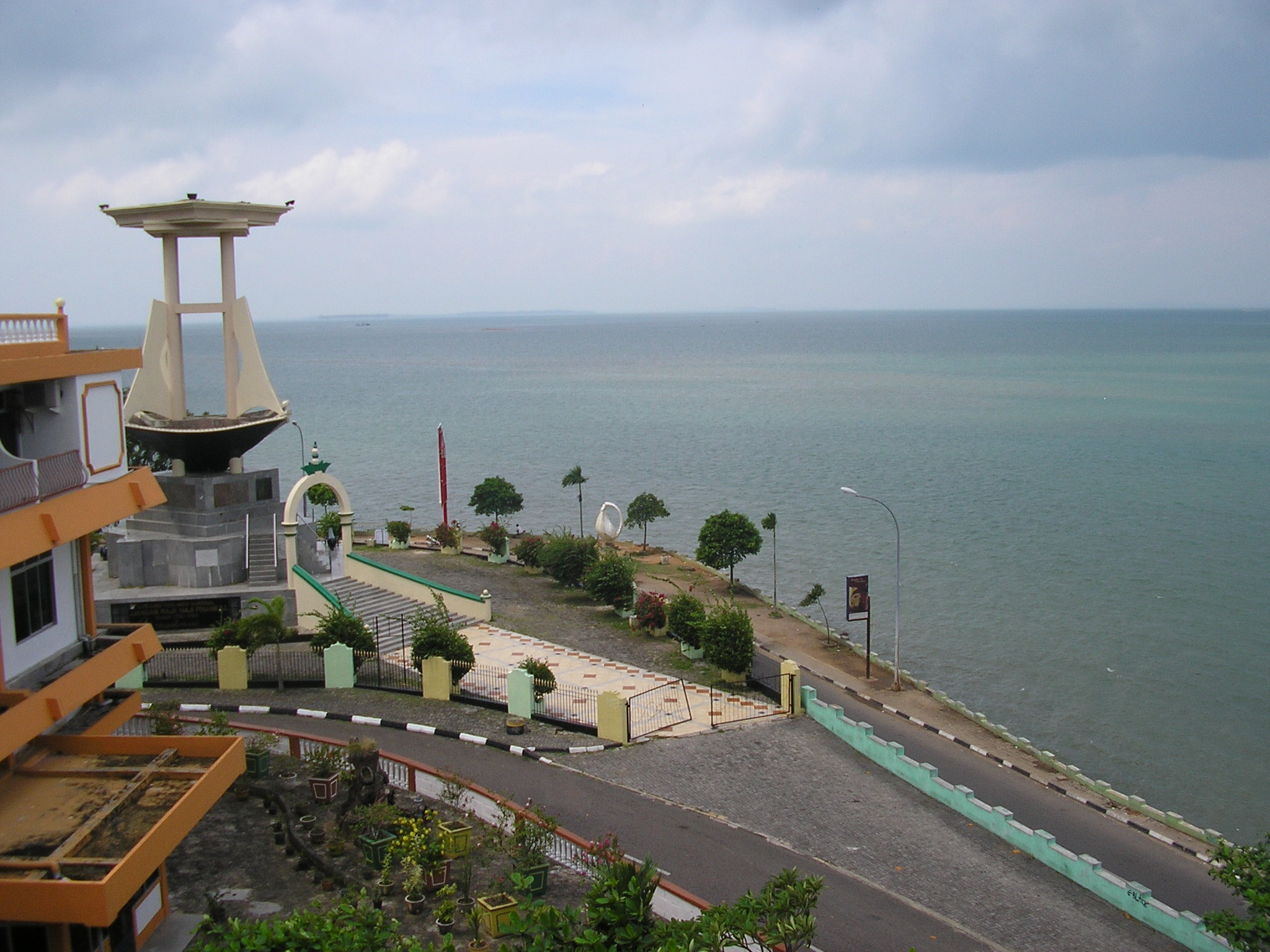
Raja Haji Fisabilillah Monument

Raja Haji Fisabillah Monument

Raja Haji Fisabilillah died during the battle of Malacca against the Dutch in 1784. A 28-metre tall Monument was erected in his memory as the national hero of Bintan. He was a famous Malayan king and had his palace (istana) on the island Penyengat, off Tanjungpinang. This monument is being considered to be put on the World Heritage list of sites which have "outstanding universal value" to the world.

=== Banyan Tree Temple ===
Banyan Tree Temple, a temple about 100 years old, is visited by the local Chinese community and Singaporeans. It is located in Senggarang town. Apart from this temple, there are several Chinese Pagodas in Singgarang near the jetty. One temple is in ruins and the other three temples, each about 100 years old, are located within a courtyard facing the sea. The interior of these temples depicts colourful paintings and wood carvings. Chinese devotees from Singapore are seen around these temples offering prayers.

== Beaches and resorts ==
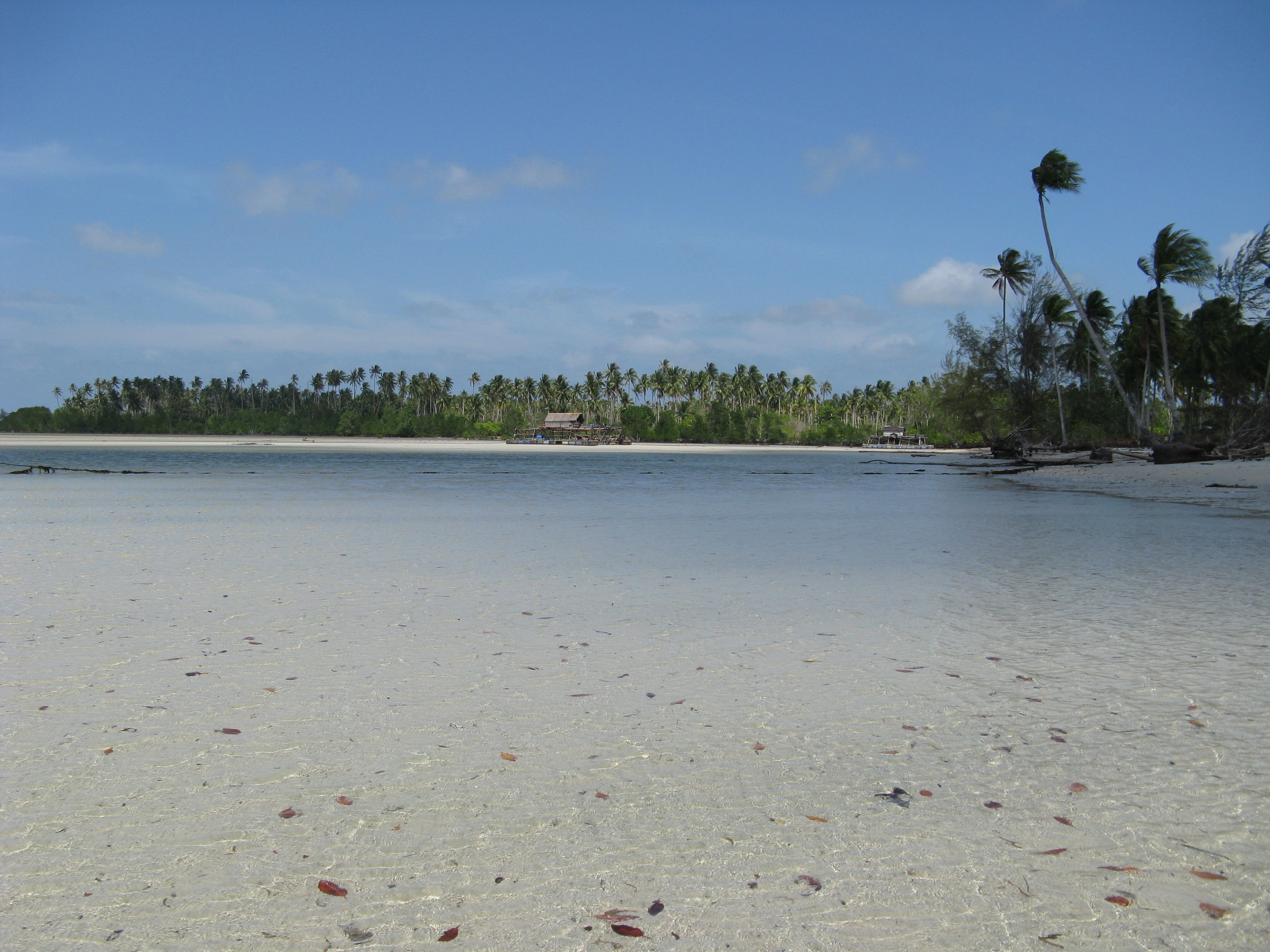
Sampat beach

The Trikora group of beaches is situated on the easternside of Bintan and are numbered from 1 to 4 from south to north. The approach road from the capital city is 45 kilometres (28 mi) to its northeast and passes through a locals town called Kangka Kawal and a picturesque fishing town called Teluk Kawal.

Bintan Resorts, located at the northern part of Bintan is delimited between 1.17°N 104.30°E and 1.20°N 104.58°E and covers an area of 23,000 hectares (57,000 acres). Many of the resorts are Internationally (e.g. ClubMed) or Singaporean owned as the island is marketed to Singaporeans for whom Bintan is a short ferry trip away, an easy weekend trip and a golf mecca with prices significantly cheaper than in Singapore. There are many other resorts around the main island of Bintan in private islands that can be booked as a unit for groups or individually. Hotels and shops are priced in Singapore or US dollars at similar prices you would pay in Singapore.
