= Senggarang =

Senggarang may refer to:

- Senggarang (Malaysia), a small town in Johor, Malaysia
- Senggarang (Indonesia), a small town in Indonesia
- MV Senggarang, a Singaporean coaster
