= Riau (disambiguation) =

Riau is a province of Indonesia.

Riau may also refer to:

- Riau Islands, province of Indonesia
- Riau Archipelago, part of Riau Islands Province
- Riau-Lingga Sultanate, a Malay Sultanate that once governed Riau-Lingga Archipelago
- Riau Residency, administrative unit of the Dutch East Indies
- Revolutionary Insurgent Army of Ukraine (RIAU)

== See also ==
- Riau Airlines
- Riau University
- Miguel Ángel Riau
