= Bentan =

The Kingdom of Bentan (Bintan) was a Malay kingdom that once stood in the area now known as Bintan, Riau Islands, Indonesia. The Bentan Kingdom was once one of the strongest powers in the Riau Archipelago, with historical ties to the Srivijaya Empire and significant influence in regional trade. Bentan also became known for its pepper cultivation and its role in maritime commerce, drawing traders from various parts of the world. The Venetian adventurer named Marco Polo (1254-1324), who had stopped there on his voyage from China in 1292, called it Pentan.

== History ==
The Bentan Kingdom is estimated to have been established in the 11th century AD. Several sources state that the founder of this kingdom was King Azhar Aya, who was later replaced by King Iskandar Syah. The location of this kingdom is estimated to be in the area now called Bukit Batu, Teluk Bintan.

== Relations with Srivijaya ==
The Bentan Kingdom was closely related to the Srivijaya Empire. After the decline of Srivijaya, the area now known as the Riau Islands, including Bintan, became a new center of power that continued the maritime and trade traditions in the region.

== Historical Relics ==
Although there are not many physical remains left, the history of the Bentan Kingdom lives on in oral tradition and some written sources. One of the historical relics believed to be related to this kingdom is the Tomb of Bukit Batu located in Teluk Bintan. This tomb is considered the resting place of important figures from the Bentan Kingdom and is part of the historical heritage that is still preserved by the local community.
