= Grand Mosque of the Sultan of Riau =

Mosque in Bintan, Riau Islands, Indonesia

- Masjid Raya Sultan Riau
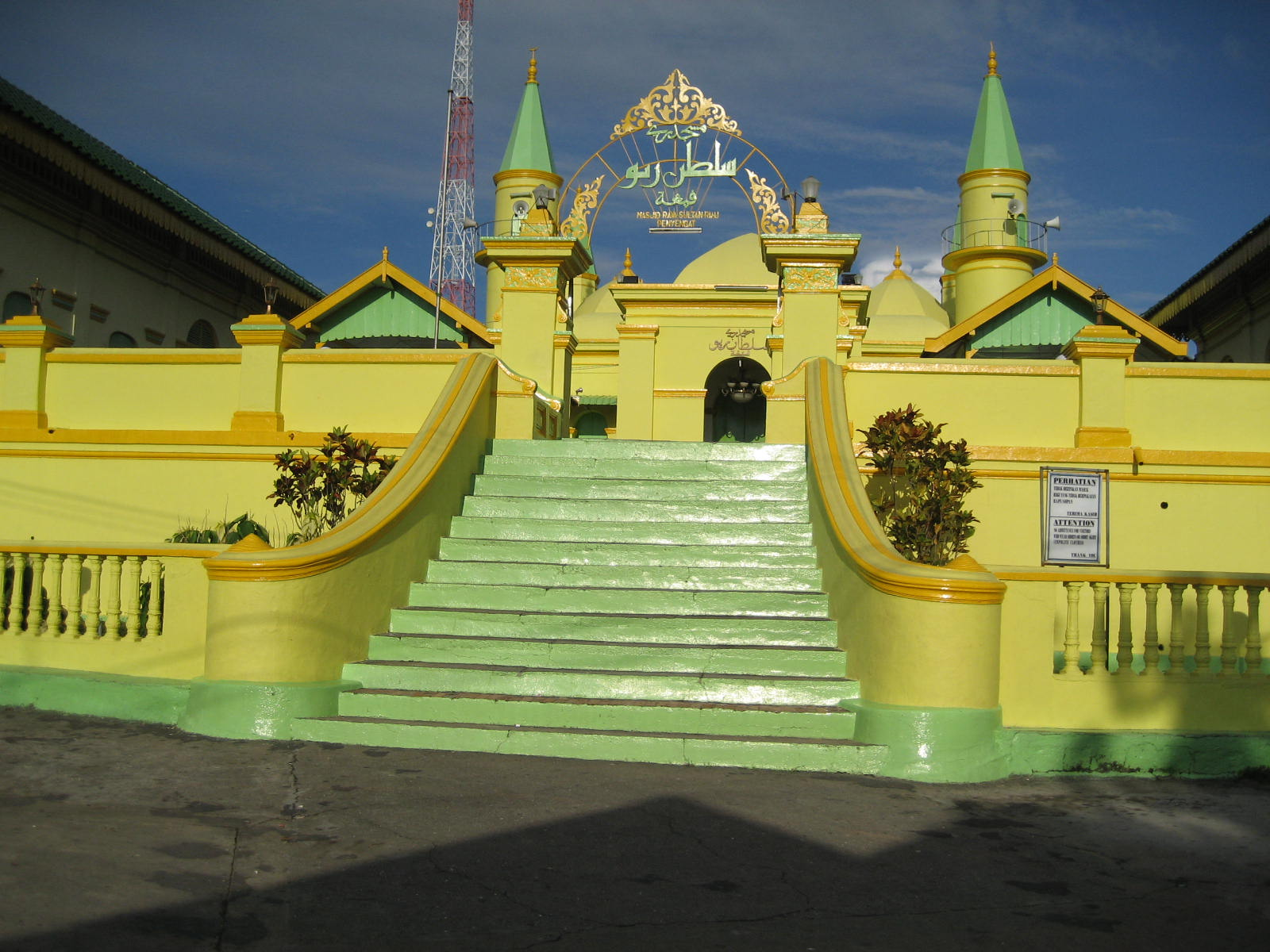

Religion
- Affiliation: Islam
- Branch/tradition: Sunni

Location
- Location: Tanjungpinang, Riau Islands, Indonesia
- Interactive map of Grand Mosque of the Sultan of Riau
- Coordinates: 0°55′46.0″N 104°25′13.4″E

Architecture
- Type: Mosque
- Established: 1844

The Grand Mosque of the Sultan of Riau (Indonesian: Masjid Raya Sultan Riau) on Penyengat Island is located outside Tanjung Pinang on Bintan island, Indonesia. The mosque was built in 1844 and is today one of Tanjung Pinang's most popular attractions for visitors.

== Penyengat Island ==
Penyengat Island was the royal seat of the once powerful Sultanate of Riau-Lingga, and it is famous for its viceroys of Riau during the 18th century conflict with European powers. Penyengat still bears the traces of its illustrious and mystic past. Despite being ruined and abandoned for almost 70 years, Penyengat has recently been restored. The old ruler's palace and royal tombs, among them the grave of the respected Raja Ali Haji, who also was creator and author of the first Malay Language grammar book, are among the legacies left by the Riau Sultanate. Still in use is the old vice-royal mosque, the Mesjid Raya.

== See also ==
- Islam in Indonesia
- List of mosques in Indonesia
