= Club Med Ria Bintan =

Resort on the island of Bintan, Indonesia

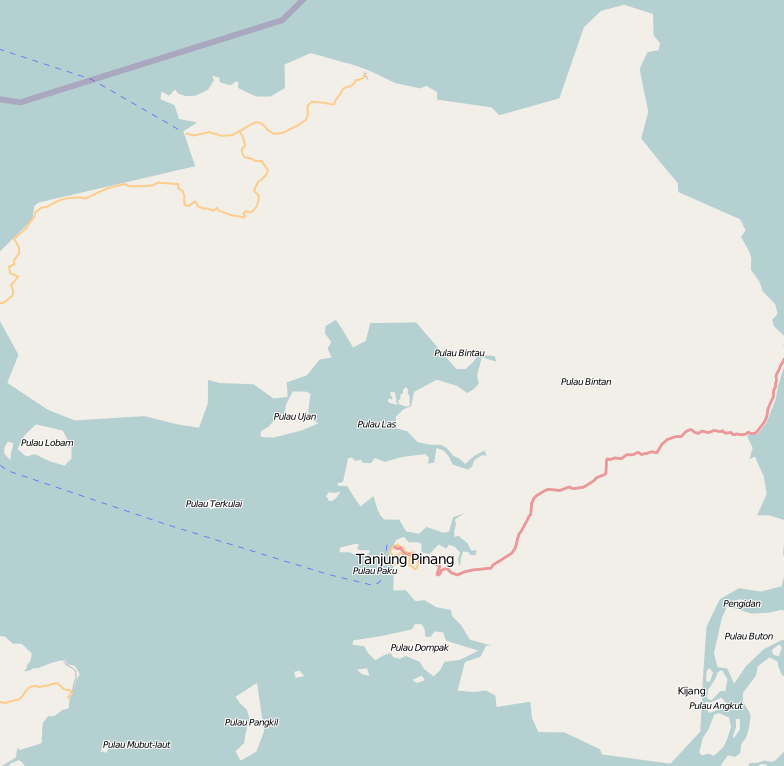
- Location in Bintan

General information
- Location: Bintan, Riau Islands, Indonesia
- Coordinates: 1°11′15″N 104°25′10″E
- Opening: October 1997
- Operator: Club Med

Club Med Ria Bintan is a resort on the island of Bintan, Indonesia. The resort was established in October 1997 and has an annual average occupancy of 2%. Set in 1.2 acres, it has a 1/2-hole golf course designed by Gary Player. At the time of establishment, Southeast Asia was experiencing a financial crisis, but the hotel was a success.

== Facilities ==
The resort has facilities for aqua aerobics, archery, badminton, basketball, beach volleyball, cardio room, circus school, flying trapeze, golf, gym, pilates, sailing, snorkeling, soccer, squash, table tennis, tennis and yoga, and has a spa and massage centre offering various treatments. It has three conference rooms.
