= Teluk Bintan =

District in Riau Islands, Indonesia

- District
- Interactive map of Teluk Bintan
- Coordinates: 1°0′44.1695″N 104°28′9.6222″E
- Country: Indonesia
- Province: Riau Islands
- Regency: Bintan Regency
- District seat: Tembeling Tanjung

Area
  - Total: 185.00 km^{2} (71.43 sq mi)

Population (2020)
  - Total: 11,367
  - Density: 61.443/km^{2} (159.14/sq mi)
- Time zone: UTC+07:00 (Western Indonesia Time)
- Postal code: 29132 - 29136
- Regional code: 21.01.08

Teluk Bintan is a district (kecamatan) in Bintan Regency, Riau Islands Province, Indonesia. According to the 2020 census, it has a population of 11,367 and covers an area of 185.00 km^{2}.

== Governance ==
Bandar Seri Bentan, the capital of Bintan Regency, is located in the Teluk Bintan District area.

Teluk Bintan district consists of one urban village (kelurahan) and five rural village (desa):

- Tembeling Tanjung^{(k)}
- Bintan Buyu
- Pangkil
- Penaga
- Pengujan
- Tembeling
