= Bintan Lagoon Resort =

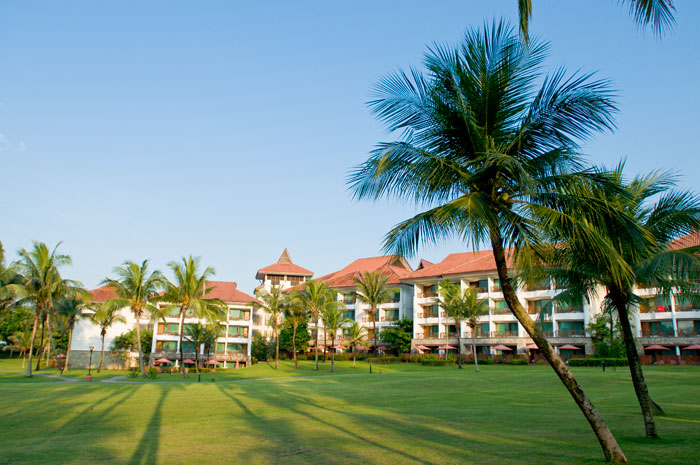

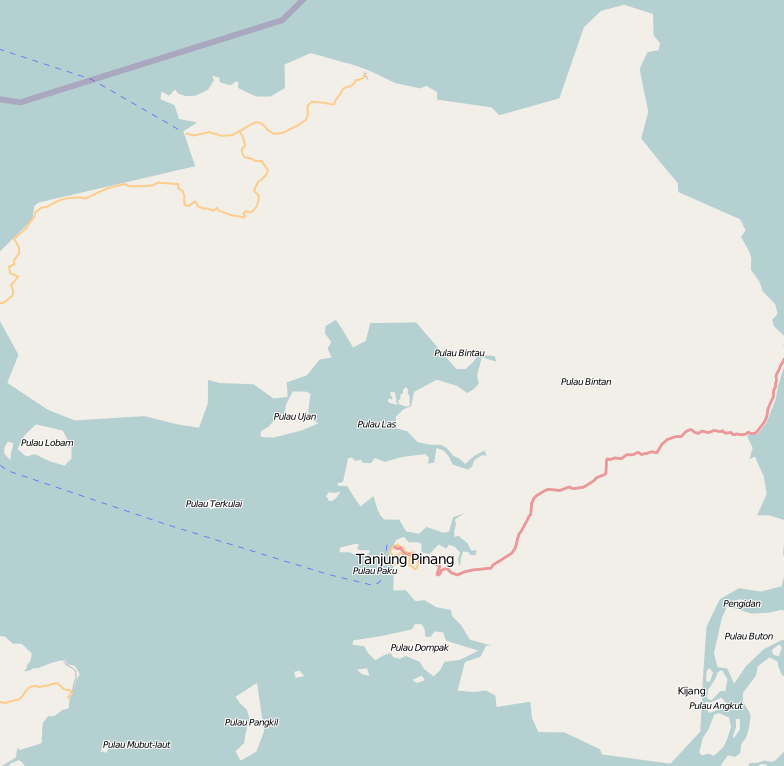
- Location in Bintan

General information
- Location: Bintan, Riau Islands, Indonesia
- Coordinates: 1.191395°N 104.424120°E

Other information
- Number of rooms: 470
- Number of restaurants: 12 (golf courses = 2)

Bintan Lagoon Resort is a hotel and resort complex on the north coast of Bintan, Indonesia. It is located 75 minutes by direct high-speed ferry from Singapore. The resort and ferry, is set in over 300 hectares of gardens overlooks the South China Sea and the archipelago of the Riau Islands.

== Facilities ==
Bintan Lagoon Resort is a five-star resort complex with about 450 rooms in Lagoi, Bintan Island. It covers 300 hectares (740 acres). The main buildings were completed around 1995 by a joint venture of Singapore, Indonesian and Japanese contractors. The resort started operations with a 473-room four-star hotel, a beachhouse, recreation club and golf clubhouse.

In 2012 the resort had 473 rooms, suites or villas, many of which looked out over the South China Sea. Facilities included a spa and three restaurants. The resort provided equipment such as ATV's and snorkels. In 2013 the resort opened a conference center, which included a banquet hall that could seat up to 1,300 people.

== Golf ==
The resort was built to serve golfers, although by 2017 it had turned into a quiet resort where people from Singapore could come to relax. The resort manages two golf courses on the island. The 18-hole Jack Nicklaus Seaview Course is a 6,420 metres (21,060 ft) par-72 course built in 1997. Jack Nicklaus was the lead architect, along with Bruce Borland and David Heatwole. The 18-hole Ian Baker-Finch Woodlands Course is a 6,211 metres (20,377 ft) par-72 course, also built in 1997. Ian Baker-Finch was the architect, with IMG Worldwide.

== Ferry service ==
In May 2012 The Jakarta Post reported that Bintan Lagoon Resort had started to offer direct ferry service between Singapore's Tanah Merah Ferry Terminal and the Bintan Lagoon Terminal, a private immigration terminal beside the resort. Two high-speed ferries would each be able to take 266 passengers. The trip would take about 70 minutes.

== LEED certification ==
On 6 January 2011 the resort obtained a silver level of LEED (Leadership in Energy and Environmental Design) certification for an area of 530,302 square feet (49,266.7 m^{2}). The project included installing a private power plant and water treatment facility. The savings in electricity and water were expected to quickly pay for the investment. It was the first golf resort in South-East Asia to be awarded LEED certification.

== Management changes ==
In 2016 Mozaic Hotels & Resorts of Singapore was the management company for the resort, which was an affiliate of WorldHotels. In August 2020 The Straits Times reported that Bintan Lagoon Resort had laid off 500 employees and was closed due to lack of business. Travel restrictions due to COVID-19 had drastically affected the tourism industry on Bintan and Batam, which rely on visitors from Singapore, Malaysia and China. At time of closure the resort was owned by Resort Venture Pte Ltd of Singapore.

In August 2022 it was reported that Accor, owner of Mövenpick Hotels & Resorts, had signed a management agreement with the owner, PT Bintan Lagoon Resort, under which they would open Mövenpick Bintan Lagoon Resort in 2023. PT Bintan Lagoon Resort is a subsidiary of PT Edika Agung Mandiri. In 2024 it was announced that the resort would open in late 2024. It would have its own ferry terminal. It would provide 413 guest rooms, restaurants featuring Swiss cuisine, a two-storey beach club, three swimming pools, gym, spa and large spaces for hosting events.

== Sources ==
- "Bintan Lagoon Resort Earns LEED Silver Certification", AsiaTravelTips.com
- "Bintan Lagoon Resort launches direct ferry service", The Jakarta Post
- Bintan Lagoon Resort, Singapore, WT Partnership
- "Bintan Lagoon Resort launches private ferry link to Singapore", TTG Asia, archived from the original on 17 August 2016
- Bintan Lagoon Resort, U.S. Green Building Council
- Chin Hui Wen (17 October 2012), "Bintan Lagoon Resort opens new private terminal with direct ferries from Singapore", I-S Magazine
- Eddy Li (2012), From A Great Escape To A New Awakening - My Journey Through Cancer, Lulu.com, ISBN 978-1-300-25808-7
- "Ian Baker-Finch Woodlands Course", GolfPass
- "Jack Nicklaus Seaview Course", GolfPass
- Latasha Seow (11 August 2020), "Covid-19: A popular getaway for Singaporeans, Bintan Lagoon Resort closing after 26 years, 500 laid off", Today, Singapore
- Mövenpick Bintan Lagoon Resort, Bintan Resorts International
- "Mövenpick Bintan Lagoon Resort to Open 2023 in Indonesia", HNR Hotel News, 19 August 2022
- Russell Darnley (2021), Beyond Borders: Conversations across boundaries, OAM
- TTG Asia Media (8 February 2013). "New conference facility to debut at Bintan Lagoon Resort".
- Vacation Industry Review, Time Sharing Institute, 1999
- Zaihan Mohamed Yusof (12 August 2020), "Bintan Lagoon Resort to close down as Bintan tourism struggles amid Covid-19 outbreak", Straits Times
