= Riau Residency =

Administrative territorial entity of the Dutch East Indies

Riau Residency (Dutch: Residentie Riouw) was an administrative territorial entity of the Dutch East Indies.

It covered the southern half of Riau Province.
