= Senggarang, Indonesia =

Coordinates: 0°58′N 104°25′E

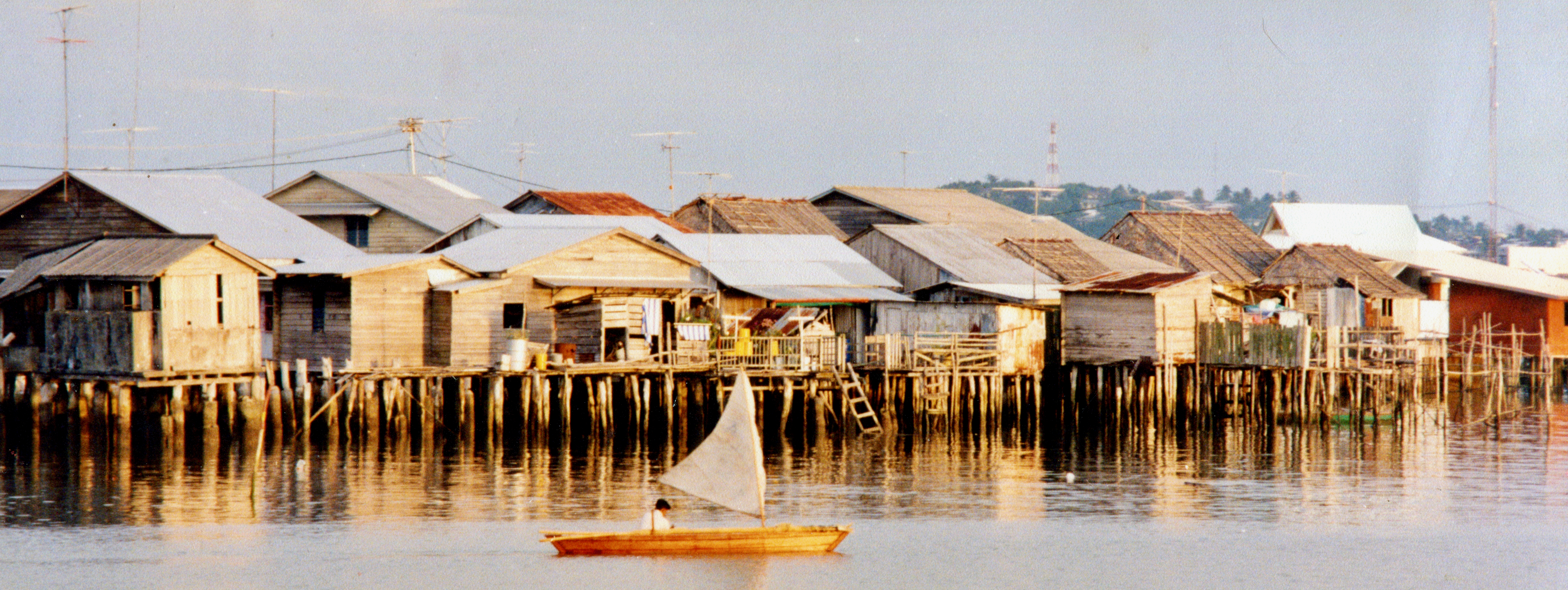
Senggarang village

Senggarang is the name of a region in Tanjungpinang and on the island of Bintan, Indonesia, which houses the oldest temple in the Riau Islands.Its biggest village is Kampung Bugis (not to be confused with Kampong Bugis in Singapore). Locals believe Senggarang was the first home for Chinese immigrants a long time ago, who then spread throughout the other island of Riau Islands.

Based on local terminology, Senggarang is called "Tua Poh", while the main part of Tanjung Pinang is termed "Soi Poh". Previously in the earlier half of the 20th century, Senggarang was the larger of the two. According to interviews and cross references amongst the elderly population, a fire sometime between 1966-1968 resulted in a large scale destruction of the industrial capacity in Senggarang. Consequently, this resulted in a large scale rebuilding as well as immigration to Batam. As a result, the town is today a largely residential area which is still predominantly Teochew.
