= Mayor of Batam =

- Wali Kota Batam
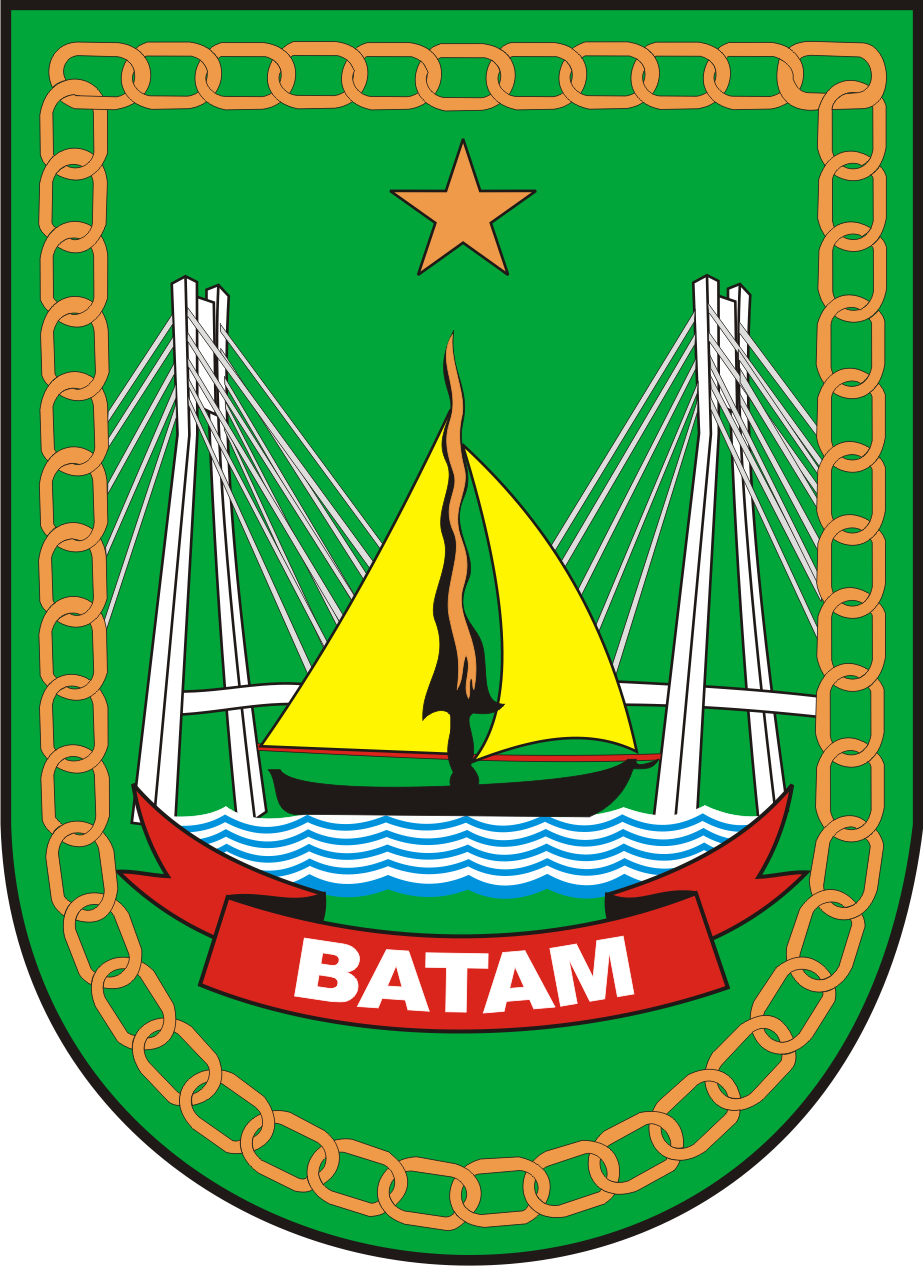
- Coat of arms of Batam

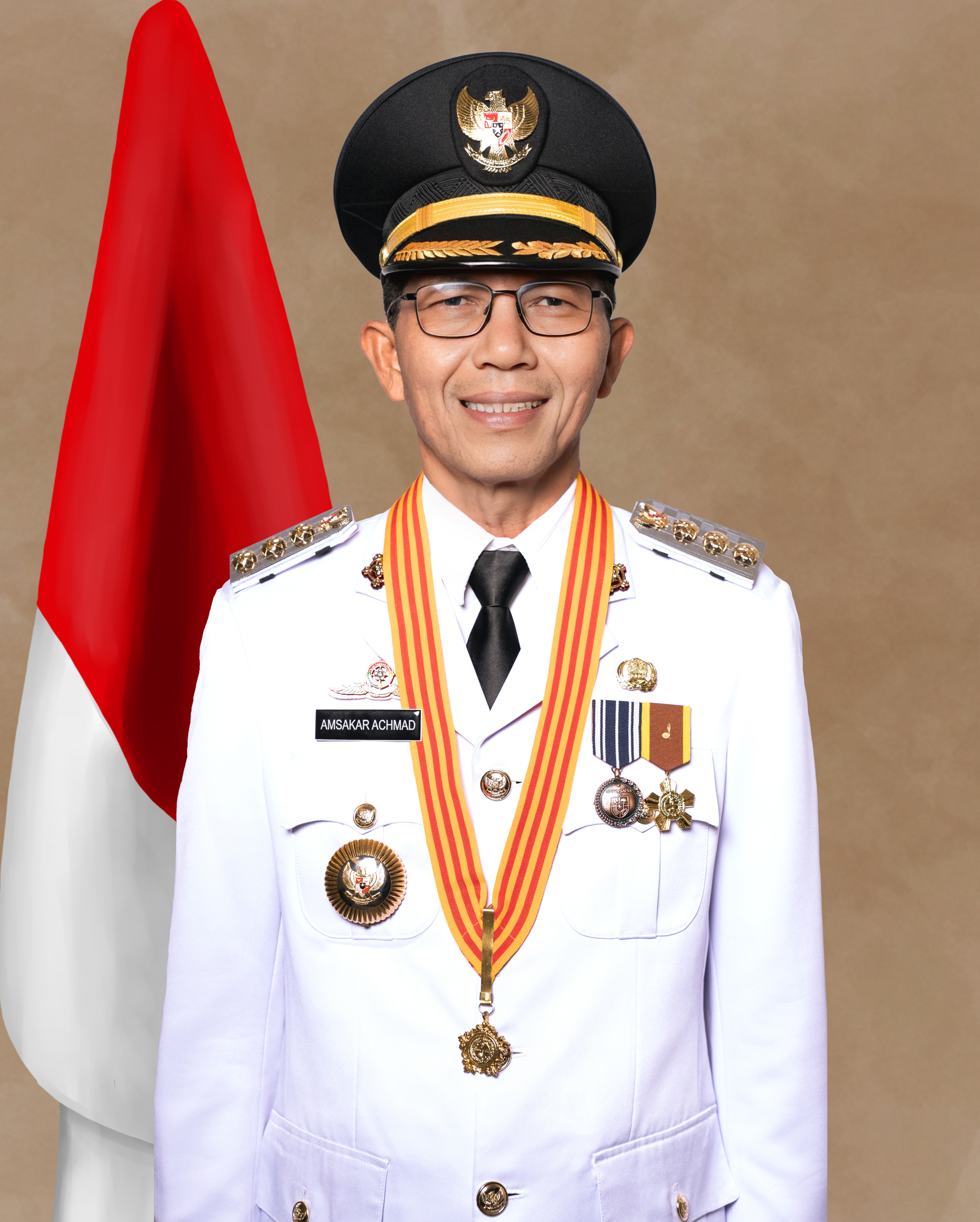
- Incumbent; Amsakar Achmad since 20 February 2025
- Term length: 5 years
- Inaugural holder: Raja Usman Draman
- Formation: 1983
- Website: Official website

Mayor of Batam is the head of the second-level region who holds the government in Batam together with the Vice Mayor and 50 members of the Batam City Regional House of Representatives. The mayor and vice mayor of Batam are elected through general elections held every 5 years. The first mayor of Batam was Raja Usman Draman, who governed the city period from 1983 to 1989.

Before becoming an autonomous city, Batam was an administrative city and was part of Riau Island Regency.

== List ==
The following is a list of the names of the Mayors of Batam from time to time.

Administrative Mayor of Batam
Num.	Portrait	Mayor	Beginning of office	End of Term	Political Party / Faction	Period	Note.	Vice mayor
1		Raja Usman Draman	1983	1989	Independent	1		N/A
2		Raja Abdul Aziz	1989	1999	Independent	2		N/A
Mayor of Batam
Num.	Portrait	Mayor	Beginning of office	End of Term	Political Party / Faction	Period	Note.	Vice mayor
1		Nyat Kadir	2001	2005	Independent	3		Asman Abnur
2		Ahmad Dahlan	1 March 2006	1 March 2011	PKS	4 (2006)		Ria Saptarika
2		Ahmad Dahlan	1 March 2011	1 March 2016	PKS	5 (2011)		Muhammad Rudi Harahap
3		Muhammad Rudi Harahap	14 March 2016	14 March 2021	Demokrat	6 (2015)		Amsakar Achmad
3		Muhammad Rudi Harahap	15 March 2021	20 February 2025	NasDem	7 (2020)		Amsakar Achmad
4		Amsakar Achmad	20 February 2025	Incumbent	NasDem	8 (2024)		Li Claudia Chandra

== Temporary replacement ==
In the government stack, a regional head who submits himself to leave or temporarily resigns from his position to the central government, then the Minister of Home Affairs prepares a replacement who is a bureaucrat in the regional government or even a vice mayor, including when the mayor's position is in a transition period.

Portrait	Mayor	Party	Beginning	End	Duration	Period	Definitive	Ref.
	Nazief Soesila Dharma (Acting)	Independent	1999	2001	1–2 years	–	Transition (1999–2001)	
	Manan Sasmita (Acting)	Independent	2005	1 March 2006	0–1 years	–	Transition (2005–2006)	
	Agussahiman (Daily executive)	Independent	1 March 2016	14 March 2016	13 days	–	Transition (2016)	
	Syamsul Bahrum (Temporary acting)	Independent	26 September 2020	5 December 2020	70 days	6 (2015)	Muhammad Rudi	(Note: Mayor Muhammad Rudi and Vice Mayor Amsakar Achmad are on campaign leave for the 2020 Batam mayoral election from 26 September 2020 to 5 December 2020, the position of Mayor is temporarily held by Acting Mayor Syamsul Bahrum.)
	Jefridin Hamid (Daily executive)	Independent	14 March 2021	15 March 2021	1 day	–	Transition (2021)	

== See also ==
- Batam
- List of incumbent regional heads and deputy regional heads in Riau Islands
