= List of regencies and cities in Riau Islands =

This is a list of regencies and cities in Riau Islands province. As of October 2019, there were 5 regencies and 2 cities.

#	Regency/ City	Capital	Regent/ Mayor	Area (km^{2})	Population (2019)	District	Kelurahan (urban village)/ Desa (village)	Logo	Location map
1	Bintan Regency	Bandar Seri Bentan	Apri Sujadi	1.318,21	154.964	10	15/36		
2	Karimun Regency	Tanjung Balai Karimun	Aunur Rafiq	912,75	247.896	12	29/42		
3	Kepulauan Anambas Regency	Tarempa	Abdul Harris	590,14	45.845	7	2/52		
4	Lingga Regency	Daik	Alias Wello	2.266,77	100.403	10	7/75		
5	Natuna Regency	Ranai	Hamid Rizal	2.009,04	81.542	15	6/70		
6	Batam	-	Muhammad Rudi	960,25	1.081.466	12	64/-		
7	Tanjungpinang	-	Rahma	144,56	207.933	4	18/-		
