= Ansar Ahmad (Indonesian politician) =

Indonesian politician (born 1964)

- انصر احمد
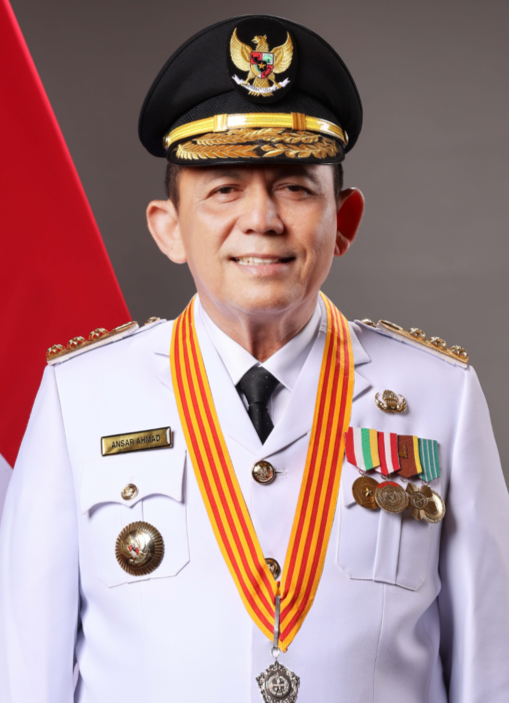
- Official portrait, 2025

5th Governor of Riau Islands
- Incumbent
- Assumed office 25 February 2021
- President: Joko Widodo; Prabowo Subianto
- Deputy: Marlin Agustina (2021–2025); Nyanyang Haris Pratamura (2025–sekarang)
- Preceded by: Isdianto; Tengku Said Arif Fadillah (act.); Suhajar Diantoro (act.)

Member of the House of Representatives
- In office 1 October 2019 – 4 September 2020
- Succeeded by: Cen Sui Lan

Regent of Bintan
- In office 10 August 2005 – 10 August 2015
- Governor: Ismeth Abdullah; Muhammad Sani
- Deputy: Mastur Taher (2005–2010); Khazalik (2010–2015)
- Preceded by: Office established
- Succeeded by: Doli Boniara (act.)

Acting Regent of Riau Islands
- In office 4 November 2003 – 9 Juli 2004
- Governor: Saleh Djasit
- Preceded by: Huzrin Hood
- Succeeded by: Andi Rivai Siregar (act.); Ansar Ahmad

Deputy Regent of Riau Islands
- In office 17 Januari 2001 – 4 November 2003
- Governor: Saleh Djasit
- Regent: Huzrin Hood
- Preceded by: Office established
- Succeeded by: Office Abolised (became deputy regent of bintan)

Personal details
- Born: 10 April 1964 (age 62) Bintan, Riau, Indonesia
- Party: Golkar
- Other political affiliations: KIM Plus (2024–present)
- Spouse: Dewi Komalasari
- Children: 2
- Education: University of Riau

Ansar Ahmad (Jawi: انصر احمد; born 10 April 1964) is an Indonesian politician who served as the 5th governor of Riau Islands following the 2020 and 2024 gubernatorial election. He had previously served as a member of the Indonesia's House of Representatives, and before that he served 10 years as regent of Bintan Regency.

== Early life ==
Ahmad was born in the town of Kijang, in Bintan Island, on 10 April 1964. He later studied economics at the University of Riau in Pekanbaru.

== Career ==
After graduating, he began to work at the local government of Riau Islands (at the time a regency) as an employee of the regional revenue office. After being promoted several times, he eventually became head of economics in Riau Islands, and in 2000 the municipal council elected him as vice-regent for Riau Islands. As the regent, Huzrin Hood, was removed by the Supreme Court in 2003, Ahmad became the acting regent. He was first elected as Bintan's regent following the 2005 regency election, in a six-candidate race where he won with 32.4 percent of votes, and he was sworn in on 10 August 2005. He was reelected in 2010 and served his second term until its expiry on 10 August 2015. He ran as the running mate of Soeryo Respatiyono during the 2015 gubernatorial elections for Riau Islands, but the pair lost.

In the 2019 legislative election, Ahmad was elected to the People's Representative Council in the Riau Islands electoral district, placing first among other legislature candidates there after securing 45,699 votes. Within the legislature, he was assigned to its fifth commission.

He later was elected governor of Riau Islands in the 2020 gubernatorial elections with Marlin Agustina as his running mate, with the pair winning 39.97% of votes. One of his primary programs is the construction of the Batam-Bintan Bridge, which he endorsed for during his term as a legislator and during campaigning for the gubernatorial election.

He is a member of Golkar, and has served as chairman of the party's Riau Islands branch between 2005 and 2020.

== Honours ==
- Satyalencana Kebaktian Sosial
- Satyalencana Wira Karya
- Lencana Darma Bakti Gerakan Pramuka
- Lencana Wiratama I Gerakan Pramuka
- Satyalencana Karya Bhakti Praja Nugraha
- Lencana Melati Gerakan Pramuka
