= Nurdin Basirun =

Indonesian politician

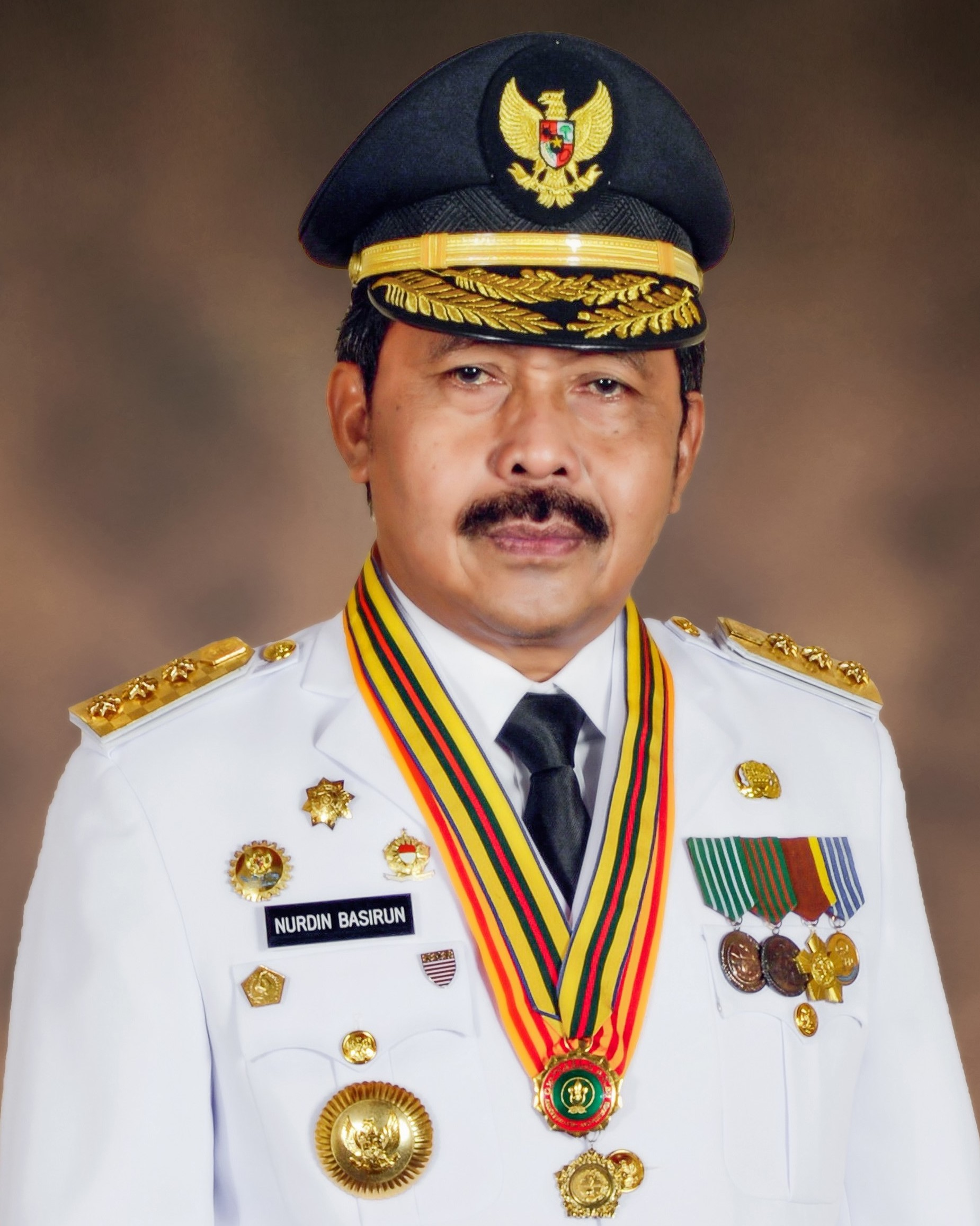

Governor of Riau Islands
- In office 25 May 2016 – 13 July 2019
- Preceded by: Muhammad Sani
- Succeeded by: Isdianto

Lieutenant Governor of Riau Islands
- In office 12 February 2016 – 25 May 2016
- Governor: Muhammad Sani
- Preceded by: Soerya Respationo
- Succeeded by: Isdianto

Regent of Karimun
- In office 2005–2015

Vice Regent of Karimun
- In office 2001–2005

Personal details
- Born: 7 July 1957 (age 69) Karimun, Riau, Indonesia
- Party: NasDem Party

Nurdin Basirun (born 7 July 1957) is an Indonesian politician who had served as the governor of Riau Islands since May 2016 until July 2019. Before serving as governor, he was briefly vice governor, and had served ten years as the regent of Karimun. In 2019, he was arrested by the Corruption Eradication Commission for receiving bribes.

== Biography ==
Basirun was born in the subdistrict of Moro, Karimun Regency, on 7 July 1957.

Basirun began his career in shipping, and eventually became the owner of a shipping company before entering politics. Prior to his provincial executive posts, Basirun was deputy regent of Karimun Regency between 2001 and 2005 under Muhammad Sani. He later became the regent between 2005 and 2015. During his time as regent, he underwent higher education, and graduated with a bachelors of education from Lancang Kuning University in 2002, and later he obtained a masters in communication from Dr. Soetomo University (2005) and a doctorate from the 17 August 1945 University (2010).

He was initially part of Golkar, being the deputy chairman for its Riau Islands provincial branch in 2014, but he later moved to Nasdem, becoming the chairman of the party's provincial office.

In 2015, Basirun ran as Sani's running mate for the province's gubernatorial seat, and the pair won the election after securing 53.2% of the votes (347,515 votes). On 12 February 2016, the pair was sworn into office. Around two months later, Sani fell ill and died on 8 April, leaving the gubernatorial post vacant until Basirun was elevated into the post on 25 May.

As governor, Basirun attempted to reinitiate the Batam-Bintan Bridge construction project - which had been mothballed since 2005 - and invited investors from Singapore and China to participate in the project. He has also come into conflict with the rest of the province's administration - with a sudden job rotation in November 2016 causing the provincial legislative body to exercise its first interpellation since the province's formation in 2002. In another occasion, Batam's mayor Muhammad Rudi noted that he was not informed of Basirun's decision to hike the electricity prices in Batam despite the two being affiliated with Nasdem.

He was arrested by the Corruption Eradication Commission on 10 July 2019. He was accused of having received bribes amounting SGD 5,000 and Rp 45 million to issue a permit for a reclamation project in a protected zone.

== Honours ==
- Lencana Melati Pramuka
- Satyalancana Wira Karya
- Satyalancana Pembangunan
- Lencana Darma Bakti
- Satyalancana Pendidikan
