= List of shipwrecks in February 1867 =

The list of shipwrecks in February 1867 includes ships sunk, foundered, grounded, or otherwise lost during February 1867.

== 1 February ==
List of shipwrecks: 1 February 1867
Ship	State	Description
Alster	United Kingdom	The brig ran aground on the Maplin Sand, in the North Sea off the coast of Essex.
Calcutta	India	The steamship struck the wreck of Satellite (United Kingdom) and sank in the Hooghly River at Calcutta with the loss of 23 lives.
Courier	United Kingdom	The brig collided with a barque and was beached at Dungeness, Kent. She was on a voyage from Africa to London.
Perseverance	United Kingdom	The sloop was wrecked on the Horse Bank, in the Irish Sea off the coast of Lancashire. Both crew were rescued by the Lytham Lifeboat. She was on a voyage from Moston, Flintshire to Preston, Lancashire.
Vendeodo	Denmark	The schooner was holed by ice and foundered in the Kattegat with the loss of three of her six crew. Survivors were rescued by the steamship Snowdoun (United Kingdom). Vendeodo was on a voyage from Burntisland, Fife, United Kingdom to a Baltic port.
Venus	United Kingdom	The schooner was driven ashore near Drogheda, County Louth. Her crew were rescued. She was on a voyage from Maryport to Killyleagh, County Down. She subsequently broke up.
Unnamed	Flag unknown	The schooner was wrecked on the Gunfleet Sand, in the North Sea off the coast of Suffolk. Her crew were rescued.
Unnamed	Flag unknown	The brig ran aground on the Cork Sand, in the North Sea off the coast of Suffolk.

== 2 February ==
List of shipwrecks: 2 February 1867
Ship	State	Description
Albion	United Kingdom	The ship foundered with the loss of all but one of her crew. The survivor took to a boat and wrote a message in a bottle, which washed up at Boarhills, Fife on 23 October. His fate is unknown.
Bewley	United Kingdom	The ship collided with the brigantine Victor (United Kingdom and was abandoned by her crew. Bewley consequently foundered. She was on a voyage from South Shields, County Durham to Dover, Kent.
Catherine	United Kingdom	The schooner collided with the steamship Lindsay (United Kingdom) and sank off Garston, Lancashire. She was on a voyage from Kingstown, County Dublin to Garston.
Enid	United Kingdom	The ship ran aground on the Goodwin Sands, Kent. She was on a voyage from Newcastle upon Tyne, Northumberland to Odesa, Russia. She was refloated and taken in to Margate, Kent.
Familie	Prussia	The schooner was run into by the steamship Pioneer (United Kingdom 6 nautical miles (11 km) off Tynemouth, Northumberland and was abandoned by her crew, who were rescued by Pioneer. Familie was on a voyage from Ipswich, Suffolk, United Kingdom to Newcastle upon Tyne, Northumberland. She was towed in to Newcastle upon Tyne by the tug Hero (United Kingdom).
Fanny Larrabee	United States	The full-rigged ship ran aground on the Brooke Ledge, off the Isle of Wight, United Kingdom. She was on a voyage from Havre de Grâce, Seine-Inférieure, France to Cardiff, Glamorgan, United Kingdom.
Gouveneur van Swieten	Netherlands	The brig was driven ashore at Beachy Head, Sussex, United Kingdom. Her thirteen crew were rescued. She was on a voyage from Buenos Aires, Argentina to Antwerp, Belgium. Gouveneur van Swieten broke up on 4 February.
Hypothesis	United Kingdom	The schooner sprang a leak and foundered off the Farne Islands, Northumberland. Her crew were rescued by the brig Harkaway (United Kingdom). Hypothesis was on a voyage from Ipswich, Suffolk to Saint Andrews, Fife.
Jane Maby	United Kingdom	The ship was driven ashore at Burghead, Moray. She was on a voyage from London to Inverness. She was refloated on 4 February and taken in to Burghead in a severely damaged condition.
Leonora	Sweden	The ship was driven ashore in Hirsholmene, Denmark. She was on a voyage from Grangemouth, Stirlingshire, United Kingdom to Copenhagen, Denmark.
Maria Anna	Netherlands	The ship was driven ashore at Zierikzee, North Holland.
Perseverance	United Kingdom	The sloop was wrecked on the Salthouse Bank, in the Irish Sea off the coast of Lancashire. Both crew were rescued by the Southport Lifeboat. She was on a voyage from Barrow-in-Furness to Preston, Lancashire.
Vesper	United Kingdom	The steamship ran aground at Dundee, Forfarshire. She was on a voyage from Sunderland, County Durham to Dundee.
Unnamed	United Kingdom	The Mersey Flat sank at Runcorn, Cheshire.
Unnamed	United Kingdom	The smack ran aground on the Annat Bank, off the mouth of the River Tay.

== 3 February ==
List of shipwrecks: 3 February 1867
Ship	State	Description
Ballindalloch	United Kingdom	The schooner was driven ashore at Peterhead, Aberdeenshire. She was on a voyage from Sunderland, County Durham to Peterhead. She was later refloated and taken in to Peterhead.
Daisy	United Kingdom	The brig ran aground on the Corton Sand, in the North Sea off the coast of Suffolk. She was on a voyage from Montevideo, Uruguay to Hull, Yorkshire. She was refloated and towed in to Hull.
Fanny	United Kingdom	The ship was driven ashore at Brook, Isle of Wight. She was on a voyage from Havre de Grâce, Seine-Inférieure, France to Cardiff, Glamorgan.
Hvide Odele	Denmark	The schooner was sunk by ice off Anholt with the loss of one of her three crew. Survivors were rescued by the steamship Snowdon (United Kingdom).
James	United Kingdom	The schooner sank off the Black Rocks, in Cardigan Bay, Wales. She was later salvaged.

== 4 February ==
List of shipwrecks: 4 February 1867
Ship	State	Description
Arab	United Kingdom	The steamship suffered a boiler explosion and sank at Gibraltar with the loss of two of her crew.
Courier	United Kingdom	The brig collided with Star of the West (United Kingdom) and sank.
Fairy	United Kingdom	The ship was driven ashore and wrecked at Shoreham-by-Sea, Sussex.
Fullerton	United Kingdom	The brig foundered in the North Sea off Bawdsey, Suffolk. Her crew were rescued by the brig Sceptre (United Kingdom). Fullerton was on a voyage from Seaham, County Durham to Southampton, Hampshire.
Gezina	Flag unknown	The ship foundered off Orfordness, Suffolk. Her crew were rescued. She was on a voyage from Newcastle upon Tyne, Northumberland, United Kingdom to Barcelona, Spain.
Glenlee	United Kingdom	The ship was abandoned in the Atlantic Ocean. Her crew survived. She was on a voyage from Madras, India to London.
Johnstone	United Kingdom	The ship was driven ashore and wrecked at Ballyteigue, County Wexford. She was on a voyage from Demerara, British Guiana to Liverpool, Lancashire.
Lucy	United Kingdom	The schooner was wrecked at Portmadoc, Caernarfonshire. Her crew were rescued. She was on a voyage from Newcastle upon Tyne to Portmadoc.
Martha Kay	United Kingdom	The barque was severely damaged by fire at Westport, County Mayo.
Monarchy	United Kingdom	The ship ran aground near Hellevoetsluis, Zeeland, Netherlands. She was later refloated.
Risk	United Kingdom	The schooner was driven ashore at Redcar, Yorkshire. She was on a voyage from Rochester, Kent to Middlesbrough, Yorkshire. She was refloated and taken in to Middlesbrough in a severely damaged condition.
Roderick Dhu	United Kingdom	The brig ran aground at Villa Real. She was refloated the next day and resumed her voyage.
St. Croix	United Kingdom	The schooner was abandoned in the North Sea. Her crew were rescued by Gouverneur (Belgium). St. Croix was on a voyage from Middlesbrough to Leith, Lothian.
St. Pierre	France	The schooner collided with another vessel and sank. She was on a voyage from Sunderland, County Durham to London, United Kingdom.

== 5 February ==
List of shipwrecks: 5 February 1867
Ship	State	Description
Cecrops	United Kingdom	The ship ran aground at Ramsgate, Kent. She was on a voyage from South Shields, County Durham to Málaga, Spain.
Edouard	France	The sloop was lost when she hit a rock north of Plateau des Minquiers, south of Jersey in the Channel Islands.
Elizabeth and Sarah	United Kingdom	The ship ran aground in the Princes Channel. She was on a voyage from Bridlington, Yorkshire to Boulogne, Pas-de-Calais, Frances. She was refloated and taken in to Ramsgate, Kent in a leaky condition.

== 6 February ==
List of shipwrecks: 6 February 1867
Ship	State	Description
Albert Edward, and Georgiana	Royal National Lifeboat Institution; United States	While coming to the assistance of the schooner Georgiana, which was dragging her anchors and being driven onto the Doom Bar at the mouth of the River Camel in Cornwall, United Kingdom, the Padstow lifeboat capsized and was driven ashore at St Minver, Cornwall, with five of the lifeboat crew drowning. One crew member from Georgiana also drowned.
Charlotte McDonald	United States	The brig sank in the Bay of Dinant off Camaret-sur-Mer, Finistère, France. Her crew were rescued.
Edendale	United Kingdom	The ship was wrecked off Madura Island, Netherlands East Indies. Her crew survived. She was on a voyage from Samarang, Netherlands East Indies to Rotterdam, South Holland, Netherlands.
Fanny Lambert	United Kingdom	During a voyage from Cardiff, Wales, to Dieppe, France, the steamship sank in a Force 10 west-northwesterly gale between 6 and 8 nautical miles (11 and 15 km) north of St Ives Head, Cornwall, England. The entire crew of 18 lost their lives.
Martha	United Kingdom	The ship was driven ashore 5 nautical miles (9.3 km) east of Cabo Corrientes, Cuba. Nine of her 25 crew were taken off by the barque Arcadia (United Kingdom). USS Winooski (United States Navy) was sent to rescue the remainder, but there was no sign of them when she reached the wreck. Martha was on a voyage from Liverpool, Lancashire to Mobile, Alabama, United States.
Perth	United Kingdom	The smack collided with the steamship Dublin (United Kingdom) and sank in the River Neath.
Star of Faith	United States	The ship was wrecked near Tabasco.

== 7 February ==
List of shipwrecks: 7 February 1867
Ship	State	Description
Anne	United Kingdom	The brig struck the pier at Whitby, Yorkshire and sank. She was on a voyage from Grimsby, Lincolnshire to Hartlepool, County Durham.
Arthur	(United Kingdom of Great Britain and Ireland) British North America	The brigantine was damaged by fire at Demerara, British Guiana.
Belfast Lass	United Kingdom	The schooner spang a leak and was run ashore at Berwick upon Tweed, Northumberland. She was refloated the next day and taken in to Berwick upon Tweed.
Daniel	United Kingdom	The ship was driven ashore at Cherbourg, Seine-Inférieure, France. She was on a voyage from Granville, Manche, France to Newcastle upon Tyne, Northumberland.
Fanny	United Kingdom	The brig sank in the River Thames at Cliffe, Kent with the loss of three of her crew. She was refloated on 25 February and beached at Gravesend, Kent.
Favourite	United Kingdom	The ship ran aground on the Black Rock, off Yarmouth, Isle of Wight. She was on a voyage from Newcastle upon Tyne to Bayonne, Basses-Pyrénées, France. She was refloated and taken in to Cowes, Isle of Wight.
Fehmarn	Prussia	The ship collided with Mathilda (Prussia) and foundered. Her crew were rescued by Mathilda Fehmarn was on a voyage from St. David's, Pembrokeshire, United Kingdom to Neustadt in Holstein.
Graces	United Kingdom	The barque was driven ashore and wrecked 20 nautical miles (37 km) from Cape Bon, Beylik of Tunis. She was on a voyage from Malta to an English port.
Jantina	United Kingdom	The brig was driven ashore and wrecked at Lochboisdale, South Uist, Outer Hebrides. Her crew were rescued. She was on a voyage from Newcastle upon Tyne to Dublin.
L'Imperatrice Eugenie	United Kingdom	The barque was wrecked off Cape Recife, Cape Colony. Her crew were rescued. She was on a voyage from Port Elizabeth, Cape Colony to London.
Surprise	United Kingdom	The schooner collided with a brig and was run ashore at Aldeburgh, Suffolk. She was on a voyage from Saint Andrews, Fife to London.

== 8 February ==
List of shipwrecks: 8 February 1867
Ship	State	Description
Alma	United Kingdom	The ship was driven ashore at Padstow, Cornwall.
Anna	United Kingdom	The ship sank at Whitby, Yorkshire.
Dashing Wave	United States	The medium clipper ran aground on the Barnegat Shoals, off the coast of New Jersey. She was refloated in a severely leaky condition and consequently sank off Sandy Hook. Her crew were rescued by a tug. She was refloated on 12 September and towed to New York. Subsequently repaired and returned to service.
Favourite	United Kingdom	The crewless barque was driven ashore at Sheringham, Norfolk. She had previously run aground on the Woolpack Sand, in The Wash whilst on a voyage from Sunderland, County Durham to London.
Fortuna	Hamburg	The ship was driven ashore at Broughton, Glamorgan, United Kingdom. Her crew were rescued. She was on a voyage from Puerto Cabello, Venezuela to Liverpool, Lancashire, United Kingdom.
Harvest Home, or Harvest Queen	United Kingdom	The steamship ran aground at Sunderland, County Durham. She was on a voyage from Sunderland to Dundee, Forfarshire. She was refloated and resumed her voyage.
Telegraph	United Kingdom	The sloop was wrecked on the Patch Sand, in the North Sea off the coast of Norfolk. Her crew were rescued by the Caister Lifeboat. She was on a voyage from Sunderland to London.
Telegraph	United Kingdom	The steamship sank at South Shields, County Durham. She was later refloated.

== 9 February ==
List of shipwrecks: 9 February 1867
Ship	State	Description
Blonde	United Kingdom	The ship was driven ashore in the Gulf of Mexico.
C. E. Rosenberg	United States	The ship was wrecked near Tabasco.
Dashing Wave	United States	The ship ran aground on the Barnegat Shoals, off the coast of New Jersey. She was on a voyage from San Francisco, California to New York. She was refloated but became waterlogged off Sandy Hook, New Jersey.
Elisa Maria	Denmark	The ship was driven ashore at Sæby. She was on a voyage from Newcastle upon Tyne, Northumberland, United Kingdom to Korsør. She was refloated and taken in to Fredrikshavn in a severely leaky condition.
Gironde	French Navy	The Loire-class transport ship was wrecked on Ball Bush Key, in the Caribbean Sea 20 nautical miles (37 km) off Jamaica.
Hermann	United Kingdom	The ship was driven ashore in the Gulf of Mexico.
Janet Walls	United Kingdom	The schooner foundered in the North Sea 40 nautical miles (74 km) off the Newarp Lightship ( Trinity House). Her crew were rescued by a smack. She was on a voyage from Methil, Fife to Ostend, West Flanders, Belgium.
John	United Kingdom	The ship capsized and sank in the River Thames with the loss of two of her crew.
Nova Speranza	Italy	The brig was wrecked in the Gulf of Palermo with the loss of all hands.
William and Ann	United Kingdom	The brig was driven ashore at Souter Point, Northumberland. She was on a voyage from Blyth, Northumberland to Great Yarmouth, Norfolk. She was refloated and towed in to North Shields, Northumberland in a severely leaky condition.
Unnamed	United Kingdom	The brigantine struck rocks and sank off the Corsewall Lighthouse, Wigtownshire.

== 10 February ==
List of shipwrecks: 10 February 1867
Ship	State	Description
Agnes	United Kingdom	The barque ran aground off Bermuda. She was on a voyage from Jamaica to Liverpool, Lancashire. She was refloated on 14 February and towed in to Bermuda.
Derwent	United Kingdom	The steamship ran aground at Sunderland, County Durham. She was on a voyage from London to Sunderland. She was refloated the next day and taken in to Sunderland.
Dorsetshire	United Kingdom	The barque foundered in Coquimbo Bay.
Ellen Dickenson	United States	The ship was wrecked at "Carlana". She was on a voyage from Cienfuegos, Cuba to New York.
Ferozepore	United Kingdom	The ship was driven ashore and wrecked on Terceira Island, Azores. She was on a voyage from Bombay, India to Liverpool, Lancashire.
Industry	United Kingdom	The smack was wrecked at Wick, Caithness. Her crew were rescued. She was on a voyage from Thurso to Wick.
John Lawrence	United Kingdom	The ship was abandoned off Havana, Cuba. She was on a voyage from Liverpool to Falmouth, Jamaica.
Pandema	United Kingdom	The ship departed from Saint Kitts for London. No further trace, presumed foundered with the loss of all hands.
St. Nicolo	Greece	The ship was wrecked between Patras and "Chlarensa".
Unnamed	United Kingdom	The brigantine was driven ashore on Holy Isle, in the Firth of Clyde.

== 11 February ==
List of shipwrecks: 11 February 1867
Ship	State	Description
Allerston	United Kingdom	The brig ran aground on the Shipwash Sand, in the North Sea off the coast of Suffolk. She was on a voyage from Sunderland, County Durham to Martinique. She was refloated and taken in to London in a leaky condition.
Betsy	United Kingdom	The ship was driven ashore at Goswick, Northumberland. She was on a voyage from Dundee, Forfarshire to the River Tyne.
Promise	(United Kingdom of Great Britain and Ireland) Guernsey	The schooner was driven ashore at Dungeness, Kent. Her crew were rescued. She was on a voyage from London to Guernsey.
Zanoni	United Kingdom	While on voyage from Port Wakefield to Port Adelaide in South Australia, the Liverpool registered barque foundered during a squall in Gulf St Vincent early in the afternoon. Fourteen crew and two passengers escaped to the vessel's small boats and were rescued at 11:00 p.m. that day by the sailing ketch Powles (flag unknown).

== 12 February ==
List of shipwrecks: 12 February 1867
Ship	State	Description
Duchess of Portland	United Kingdom	The ship foundered 15 nautical miles (28 km) off Hartlepool, County Durham after taking in water. Crew were saved from the ship's boat. She had been sailing from Sunderland, County Durham to Le Conquet, Finistère, France with a cargo of coal.
Eliza Jenkins	United Kingdom	The ship sank at Cuxhaven. She was on a voyage from Hamburg to Liverpool, Lancashire. She was refloated on 24 February.
Margaret Littlejohn	United Kingdom	The schooner ran aground on the Schougall Rocks, 5 nautical miles (9.3 km) west of Dunbar, Lothian. Her crew were rescued. She was on a voyage from the River Tyne to Aberdeen.
Susan Mary	United Kingdom	The ship sprang a leak and sank off the Nab Lightship ( Trinity House). Her crew were rescued. She was on a voyage from Poole, Dorset to London.

== 13 February ==
List of shipwrecks: 13 February 1867
Ship	State	Description
Albreda	United Kingdom	The ship departed from Prampram, Gold Coast for London. No further trace, presumed foundered with the loss of all hands.
HMS Dryad	Royal Navy	The Amazon-class sloop struck rocks off Downderry, Cornwall and was beached in Whitsand Bay. She was refloated and taken in to Plymouth, Devon for repairs.
Louis de Geer	Sweden	The ship was wrecked near Thisted, Denmark. She was on a voyage from Marstrand to an English port.
Reiny	France	The ship was wrecked near Camaret-sur-Mer, Finistère. She was on a voyage from Grimsby, Lincolnshire, United Kingdom to L'Orient, Morbihan.
Star of the Evening	(United Kingdom of Great Britain and Ireland) New Zealand	The steamer was wrecked at Poverty Bay whilst en route from Napier to Auckland. She struck rocks which at first seemed to have caused only slight damage, but the ship broke up within an hour. Six of the 17 people on board (three crew and three passengers) drowned.

== 14 February ==
List of shipwrecks: 14 February 1867
Ship	State	Description
Gibraltar	United Kingdom	The steamship foundered in the Dogger Bank. Her crew were rescued by a fishing smack. She was on a voyage from Helsingborg, Sweden to Grimsby, Lincolnshire.
Melody	United Kingdom	The ship departed from Saint Lucia for London. No further trace, presumed foundered with the loss of all hands.
North Star	United Kingdom	The ship departed from London for Philadelphia, Pennsylvania, United States. No further trace, presumed foundered with the loss of all hands.
Orcadian	United Kingdom	The ship was wrecked on the Tuskar Rock with the loss of one of her sixteen crew. She was on a voyage from Liverpool, Lancashire to Savannah, Georgia, United States.
William and Sarah	United Kingdom	The schooner sprang a leak and foundered in the Atlantic Ocean 60 nautical miles (110 km) north west of the Isles of Scilly. Her crew were rescued by Heimdal (Denmark. William and Sarah was on a voyage from Shoreham-by-Sea, Sussex to Milford Haven, Pembrokeshire.

== 16 February ==
List of shipwrecks: 16 February 1867
Ship	State	Description
Conqueror	United Kingdom	The ship was wrecked on Fortune Island, Bahamas. She was on a voyage from St. Jago de Cuba, Cuba to Swansea, Glamorgan.
George V	United Kingdom	The ship caught fire at Valparaíso, Chile and was scuttled.
John Doull	United Kingdom	The ship was wrecked on Cayo Gorde. She was on a voyage rom Liverpool, Lancashire to Havana, Cuba.
Nile	(United Kingdom of Great Britain and Ireland) New Zealand	The 24-ton schooner became a wreck after running ashore at the mouth of the Haast River. This may have been the same Nile which was reported wrecked in June 1864.
Sussex Maid	United Kingdom	The ship ran aground in the Adour. She was on a voyage from Bayonne, Basses-Pyrénées to Gloucester. She was refloated and put back to Bayonne for repairs.

== 17 February ==
List of shipwrecks: 17 February 1867
Ship	State	Description
Grand Trianon	United Kingdom	The ship was sighted off Cuba whilst on a voyage from Pensacola, Florida to Queenstown, County Cork. No further trace, presumed foundered with the loss of all hands.
Royal Mint	United Kingdom	The ship was wrecked on Carpenter's Rock, Sierra Leone. Her crew were rescued. She was on a voyage from Sherbro Island, Sierra Leone to Liverpool, Lancashire.

== 18 February ==
List of shipwrecks: 18 February 1867
Ship	State	Description
Eden	United Kingdom	The barque ran aground at Roquetas, Spain. She was on a voyage from Nicolaieff, Russia to Falmouth, Cornwall. She was refloated and resumed her voyage.
St. Lew	France	The ship was wrecked.
Tartar	United Kingdom	The ship was driven ashore at Deal, Kent. She was on a voyage from Calcutta, India to New York, United States.

== 19 February ==
List of shipwrecks: 19 February 1867
Ship	State	Description
Mercury	(United Kingdom of Great Britain and Ireland) New Zealand	The cutter became a wreck after running ashore at East Cape, New Zealand.
Ness	United Kingdom	The ship was wrecked near Crow Head, County Cork. She was on a voyage form Dingle, County Kerry to Cork.

== 20 February ==
List of shipwrecks: 20 February 1867
Ship	State	Description
Constance	United Kingdom	The ship ran aground on the Jordan Flats, in Liverpool Bay. She was refloated.
Cygnet	United Kingdom	The steamship sank in the Crinan Canal. She was refloated on 22 February and taken in to Greenock, Renfrewshire.
Diana	United Kingdom	The brigantine was abandoned in a sinking condition. Her crew were rescued by Rex (United Kingdom).
Venture	United Kingdom	The ship was holed by an anchor and sank at Tralee, County Kerry.
Villager	United Kingdom	The ship was driven ashore at Lossiemouth, Moray. She was on a voyage from Hartlepool, County Durham to Nairn.

== 21 February ==
List of shipwrecks: 21 February 1867
Ship	State	Description
Alderman	United Kingdom	The brig ran aground on the Cockle Sand, in the North Sea off the coast of Norfolk.
Alida	(United Kingdom of Great Britain and Ireland) British North America	The ship was abandoned in the Atlantic Ocean. Her crew were rescued by Cleopatra (United Kingdom). Alida was on a voyage from Liverpool, Lancashire to Boston, Massachusetts, United States.
Gironde	France	The steamship ran aground on Cave Bush Cay. She was on a voyage from France to Veracruz, Mexico.
Miranda	United Kingdom	The steamship was run into by the steamship Thames (United Kingdom) and sank in the North Sea off the coast of Suffolk. Her crew were rescued by Thames.
Queen Hortense	United Kingdom	The barque was abandoned in the Atlantic Ocean with the loss of two of her eleven crew. Survivors were rescued by Westmoreland (United Kingdom), Queen Hortense was on a voyage from Trinidad to the Clyde.
Freraro Baston	United Kingdom	The steamship was driven ashore and wrecked near Kingstown, County Dublin. Her crew were rescued. She was on a voyage from Glasgow, Renfrewshire to Bahia, Brazil.

== 22 February ==
List of shipwrecks: 22 February 1867
Ship	State	Description
Helen R. Cooper	United States	The ship ran aground on the Barnard Sand, in the North Sea off the coast of Suffolk, United Kingdom. She was on a voyage from South Shields, County Durham to New York. She was refloated and resumed her voyage.
Lord Seaton	United Kingdom	The barque was driven ashore at Garrucha, Spain. She was refloated the next day.
Pearl	United Kingdom	The ship ran aground on the Aldeburgh Ledge, in the North Sea off the coast of Suffolk. She was on a voyage from South Shields to Teignmouth, Devon. She was refloated and resumed her voyage.

== 23 February ==
List of shipwrecks: 23 February 1867
Ship	State	Description
De Hoop	Flag unknown	The ship was driven ashore. She was on a voyage from Montevideo, Uruguay to Ipswich, Suffolk, United Kingdom. She was refloated and assisted in to Harwich, Essex, United Kingdom.

== 24 February ==
List of shipwrecks: 24 February 1867
Ship	State	Description
Arcadian	United Kingdom	The ship was wrecked on the South Rock. Her crew were rescued. She was on a voyage from Liverpool, Lancashire to Savannah, Georgia, United States.
Constance	United Kingdom	The ship struck the pier at Sunderland, County Durham and was severely damaged. She was on a voyage from Sunderland to Southampton, Hampshire.
Lifeboat	United Kingdom	The schooner was driven ashore at Cromarty. She was on a voyage from Dingwall, Ross-shire to Newcastle upon Tyne, Northumberland.

== 25 February ==
List of shipwrecks: 25 February 1867
Ship	State	Description
Coldstream	United Kingdom	The brig was wrecked on the Nordervog Sandbank, in the North Sea off the coast of Prussia. Her crew survived. She was on a voyage from Sunderland, County Durham to Hamburg.
Coquimbo	United Kingdom	The barque ran aground on the Jordan Flats, in Liverpool Bay. Her fifteen crew were rescued by the Liverpool Lifeboat No.2. Coquimbo was on a voyage from Liverpool, Lancashire to Alicante, Spain. She was refloated and towed in to Birkenhead, Cheshire by the tug Royal Arch (United Kingdom).
Guide	United Kingdom	The paddle tug collided with a steamship and sank in the North Sea 4 nautical miles (7.4 km) off the mouth of the River Tyne. Her crew were rescued by the steamship.
Herzog Johann Albrecht	Grand Duchy of Mecklenburg-Schwerin	The barque sank at Valparaíso, Chile.
Hugo Grotius	Netherlands	The ship ran aground in New York Bay. sHe was on a voyage from New York, United States to Rotterdam, South Holland. She was refloated and put back to New York.
Peter Brown	United Kingdom	The schooner was wrecked at Carnbulg, Aberdeenshire. Her crew were rescued. She was on a voyage from Inverness to Newcastle upon Tyne, Northumberland.
Princess Victoria	United Kingdom	The ship was driven ashore at Goswick, Northumberland. She was on a voyage from Aberdeen to Sunderland, County Durham. She had become a wreck by 9 March.

== 26 February ==
List of shipwrecks: 26 February 1867
Ship	State	Description
Bertha	United Kingdom	The ship was wrecked on the Rocques. She was on a voyage from La Guayra to Puerto Cabello, Venezuela .
Breidablik	Norway	The schooner was wrecked on the Jadder Sandbank, in the North Sea off the coast of Prussia. Her crew were rescued by rocket apparatus. She was on a voyage from Cardiff, Glamorgan, United Kingdom to Bergen.
John Matthie	United Kingdom	The ship was abandoned at sea. She was on a voyage from Jamaica to London.
Maryanne Berth	Danzig	The ship was driven ashore at "Hitdon", Denmark. She was on a voyage from Danzig to London. She was refloated and taken in to Helsingør, Denmark.
Peace	United Kingdom	The brig was wrecked at Thisted, Denmark with the loss of seven of her nine. She was on a voyage from Blyth, Northumberland to Copenhagen, Denmark.
Robert Stephenson	United Kingdom	The brig foundered in the North Sea. Her crew were rescued by the smack Fear Not (United Kingdom). Robert Stephenson was on a voyage from Blyth to Copenhagen.

== 27 February ==
List of shipwrecks: 27 February 1867
Ship	State	Description
Confiance	France	The schooner ran aground and sank at Fécamp, Seine-Inférieure. Her crew were rescued. She was on a voyage from Swansea, Glamorgan, United Kingdom to Fécamp.
Florence	United Kingdom	The steamship ran aground off Heligoland. She was on a voyage from Leith, Lothian to Hamburg. She was refloated.

== 28 February ==
List of shipwrecks: 28 February 1867
Ship	State	Description
Dennis Horton	United States	The barque was abandoned in the Atlantic Ocean. She was on a voyage from Cardiff, Glamorgan, United Kingdom to Boston, Massachusetts.
General Lee	United Kingdom	The lugger was run into by a schooner in the English Channel and was abandoned by her crew. She was subsequently taken in to Plymouth, Devon by the fishing lugger Swan (United Kingdom).
Gratitude	United Kingdom	The schooner was wrecked at Aberdovey, Merionethshire. Her crew were rescued by the Aberdovey Lifeboat. She was on a voyage from Liverpool, Lancashire to Aberdovey.
John and Henry	United Kingdom	The ship was driven ashore at Ballyferris, County Down. She was on a voyage from Ardrossan, Ayrshire to Runcorn, Cheshire. She was refloated and taken in to Donaghadee, County Down.
Pelham	United Kingdom	The ship was wrecked on the French coast. Her crew were rescued. She was on a voyage from Bordeaux, Gironde to Sunderland, County Durham.
William Thacker	United Kingdom	The ship ran aground on the Owers Sandbank, in the English Channel off the coast of Suffolk. She was on a voyage from London to Caen, Calvados, France. She was refloated and put into Portsmouth, Hampshire.

== Unknown date ==
List of shipwrecks: Unknown date in February 1867
Ship	State	Description
Achilles	United Kingdom	The ship ran aground in the "Woonspo River. She was on a voyage from Liverpool, Lancashire to Shanghai, China.
Aden	United Kingdom	The brig was driven ashore. She was refloated and towed in to Cárdenas, Cuba.
Albanian	United Kingdom	The steamship was driven ashore at "Umages". She was on a voyage from Liverpool to Trieste.
Cameronian	United Kingdom	The ship was driven ashore in Dungarvan Bay in early February. She was later refloated and towed to Cardiff, Glamorgan.
Conheath	United Kingdom	The ship was wrecked on the Kara Hajee Reef, in the Rhio Strait before 7 February. She was on a voyage from Singapore, Straits Settlements to Liverpool, Lancashire.
Fire Sonne	Norway	The ship was wrecked. She was on a voyage from Torrevieja, Spain to Christiania.
Fortuna	Prussia	The brig was driven ashore and wrecked in Broughton Bay. Her crew were rescued.
Gazelle	United Kingdom	The barque was wrecked at the entrance to the Rhio Strait between 8 and 22 February. She was on a voyage from Singapore to London.
Graham	United States	The ship was wrecked on Anegada, Virgin islands. She was on a voyage from Aux Cayes, Haiti to New York.
Golden City	United Kingdom	The ship was wrecked on a reef off Elliot Island, New South Wales before 16 February.
Harriet	United Kingdom	The brig was driven ashore at Nuevitas, Cuba.
Jane Alice	United Kingdom	The barque was abandoned in the Mediterranean Sea off Cape de Gatt, Spain. Her crew were rescued by the steamship Ceres (Spain).
Julia	United Kingdom	The barque was abandoned in the Atlantic Ocean before 15 February.
Lady Emily Peel	United Kingdom	The ship was wrecked on Gun Cay. She was on a voyage from New Orleans, Louisiana, United States to Liverpool.
Marette	United Kingdom	The ship was wrecked in the Rhio Strait. She was on a voyage from Singapore to London.
Mary Fenwick	United Kingdom	The brig was driven ashore near Tangier, Morocco. She was on a voyage from Taganrog, Russia to Cork She was refloated and towed in to Gibraltar, where she arrived on 4 February.
M. F. Varnam	United States	The ship sank 150 nautical miles (280 km) east of Bermuda. Her crew were rescued by Kneale (United Kingdom. M. F. Varnam was on a voyage from Bucksport, Maine to Pensacola, Florida.
Moonlight	United States	The brig ran aground on the Shipwash Sand, in the North Sea off the coast of Suffolk, United Kingdom. She was refloated with assistance.
Nicholas Bidder	United Kingdom	The ship was driven ashore and severely damaged in Puget Sound. She was refloated with assistance from HMS Sparrowhawk (Royal Navy).
Odense Packet	Denmark	The ship ran aground on the Doalengrunden. She was on a voyage from Newcastle upon Tyne, Northumberland, United Kingdom to Odense. She was refloated but found to be sinking and was abandoned.
Symbal	United Kingdom	The ship ran aground on the Ooster Bank, in the North Sea off the Dutch coast. She was refloated and taken in to Hellevoetsluis, Zeeland in a leaky condition.
White Squall	United States	The ship was driven ashore at Cape Cod, Massachusetts before 12 February. She was on a voyage from Singapore to Boston, Massachusetts. She subsequently broke up.
Unnamed	France	The ship was wrecked on St. George's Island, Bermuda.
