= 2024 Riau Islands gubernatorial election =

- 27 November 2024
- Turnout: 54.61% (▼13.95pp)
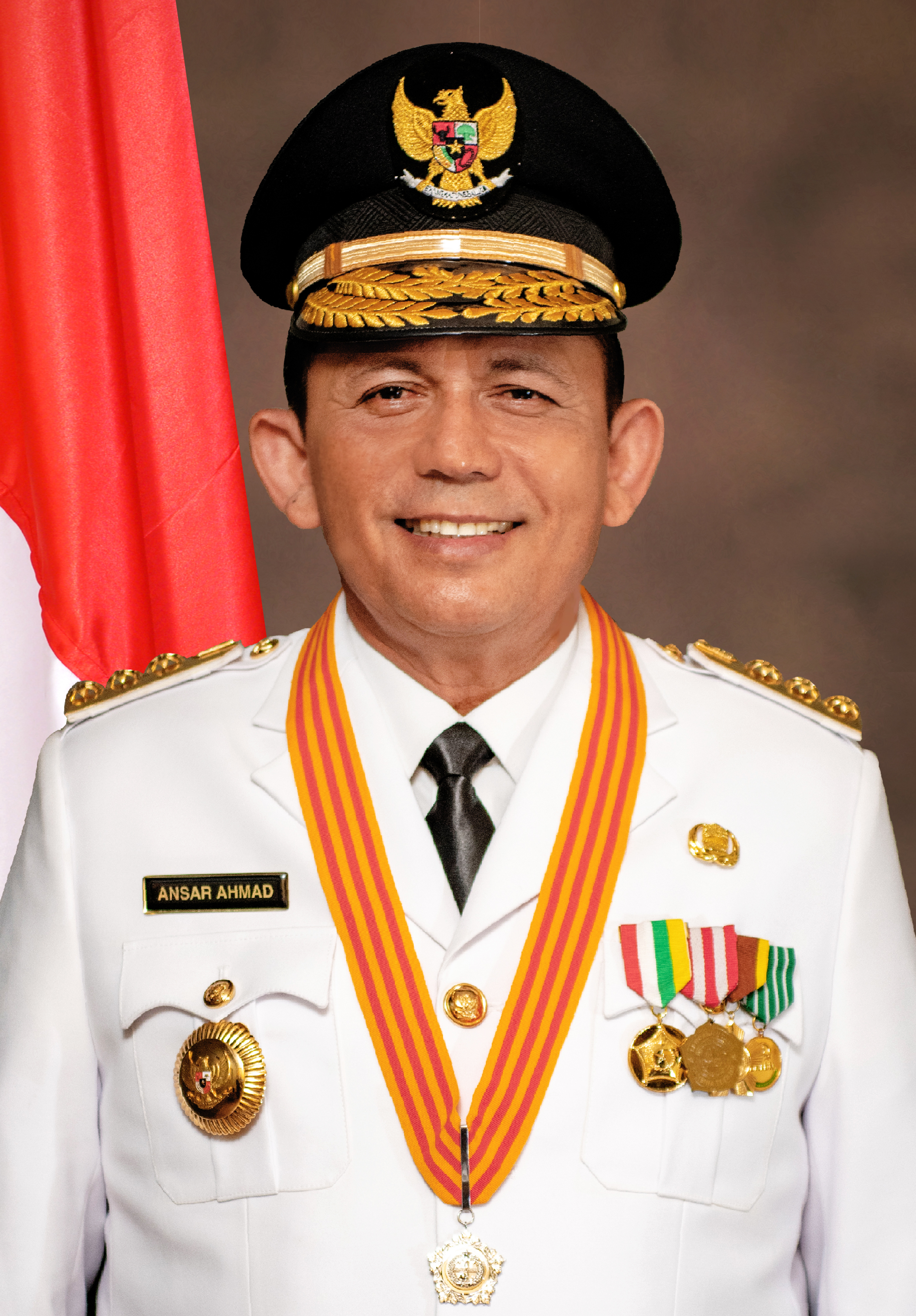

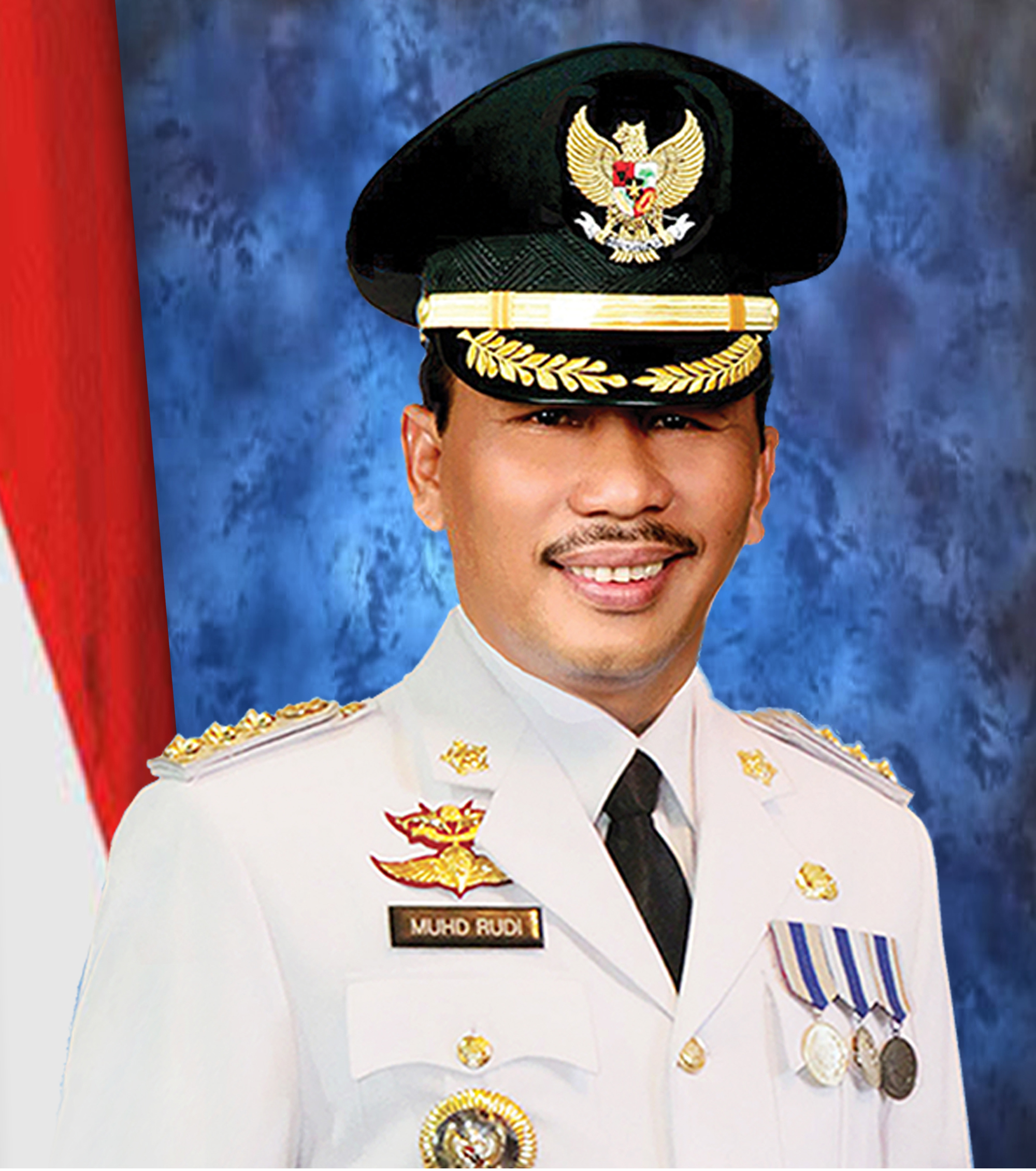
Candidate	Ansar Ahmad	Muhammad Rudi
Party	Golkar	NasDem
Alliance	KIM Plus	–
Running mate	Nyanyang Haris Pratamura	Aunur Rafiq
Popular vote	450,109	367,367
Percentage	55.06%	44.94%
- Results map by district (Interactive version)
Governor before election
Ansar Ahmad
Golkar
Elected Governor
Ansar Ahmad
Golkar

The 2024 Riau Islands gubernatorial election was held on 27 November 2024 as part of nationwide local elections to elect the governor and vice governor of the Riau Islands for a five-year term. The previous election was held in 2020. Incumbent Governor Ansar Ahmad of Golkar won re-election with 55% of the vote. His sole opponent, Batam Mayor Muhammad Rudi of the NasDem Party, received 44%.

== Electoral system ==
The election, like other local elections in 2024, follow the first-past-the-post system where the candidate with the most votes wins the election, even if they do not win a majority. It is possible for a candidate to run uncontested, in which case the candidate is still required to win a majority of votes "against" an "empty box" option. Should the candidate fail to do so, the election will be repeated on a later date.

== Candidates ==
According to electoral regulations, in order to qualify for the election, candidates were required to secure support from a political party or a coalition of parties controlling 9 seats (20 percent of all seats) in the Riau Islands Regional House of Representatives (DPRD). Golkar and Gerindra, both winning 9 of 45 seats in the 2024 legislative election, are eligible to nominate a candidate without forming a coalition with other parties. Candidates may alternatively demonstrate support to run as an independent in form of photocopies of identity cards, which in Riau Islands' case corresponds to 150,974 copies. No independent candidates registered prior to the General Elections Commission (KPU) deadline of 12 May 2024.

=== Potential ===
The following are individuals who have either been publicly mentioned as a potential candidate by a political party in the DPRD, publicly declared their candidacy with press coverage, or considered as a potential candidate by media outlets:

- Ansar Ahmad (Golkar), incumbent governor.
- Muhammad Rudi (NasDem), mayor of Batam.
- Yan Fitri Halimansyah, head of the Riau Islands provincial police.

== Political map ==
Following the 2024 Indonesian legislative election, eleven political parties are represented in the Riau Islands DPRD:

Political parties	Seat count
Great Indonesia Movement Party (Gerindra)	9 / 45
Party of Functional Groups (Golkar)	9 / 45
NasDem Party	7 / 45
Prosperous Justice Party (PKS)	6 / 45
Indonesian Democratic Party of Struggle (PDI-P)	4 / 45
Democratic Party (Demokrat)	3 / 45
National Awakening Party (PKB)	2 / 45
National Mandate Party (PAN)	2 / 45
Indonesian Solidarity Party (PSI)	1 / 45
Perindo Party	1 / 45
People's Conscience Party (Hanura)	1 / 45

== Results ==
Candidate	Running mate	Party	Votes	%
Ansar Ahmad	Nyanyang Haris Pratamura	Golkar	450,109	55.06
Muhammad Rudi	Aunur Rafiq	NasDem Party	367,367	44.94
Total			817,476	100.00
Valid votes			817,476	95.98
Invalid/blank votes			34,253	4.02
Total votes			851,729	100.00
Registered voters/turnout			1,559,727	54.61
Source: KPU
