= Meitei Pangals =

Meitei speaking Muslim community of Eastern South Asia

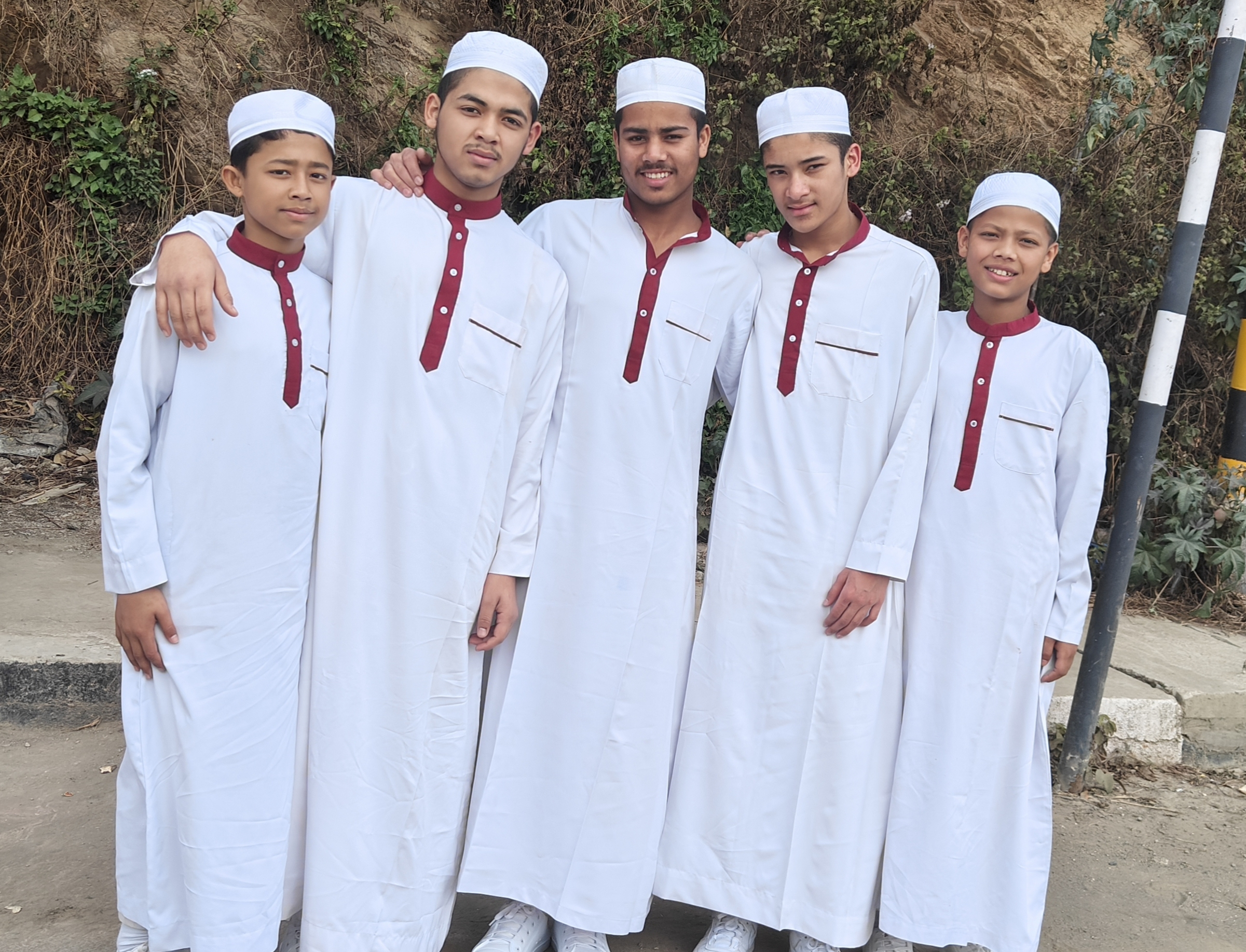
- Pangals on Mawlid 2025 in Manipur Creative School

Total population
- 358,000

Regions with significant populations
- India • Bangladesh • Myanmar
- Manipur: <240,000
- Assam: 80,000
- Tripura (Kamalpur): 3000
- Mizoram: Unknown
- Bangladesh: 25,000
- Myanmar: 10,000

Languages
- Pangal, Bengali

Religion
- Sunni Islam

Related ethnic groups
- Meitei

The Meitei Pangals, (Note: There are also called "Pangans", In Myanmar called "Kathe Muslims") also known as Meitei Muslims or the Manipuri Muslims, are a group of Meitei Muslims. The word pangal simply means 'Muslim' in the Meitei people similar as the Hui people, Moro people and the Bosniaks. They live mainly in Manipur, India. Various historical sources have different dates for when Islam first entered Manipur. However, the date all sources seem to confirm as definitive is 1606. The origin of the Pangal people is equally varied. Pangals recognised as Indigenous by Gov. of Manipur.

== Etymology ==
The word Pangal is widely held to be a corruption of the word Bangal (Bengal), reflecting the geographic origins of the earliest Muslim settlers, who arrived in the Manipur Valley from the Bengal region.

One account recorded in the Persian text Yaad Dasht Kursee-e-Nama by Rafayattullah assigns the term specifically to a Muslim commander named Muhammad Sani following the Battle of Toubul (near present-day Bishnupur District) in 1606 AD: King Khagemba addressed the commander as Panganba meaning "the strong one" in Meiteilon and called his troops Pangal. The term has remained in use ever since for all Muslims in Manipur.

In the neighbouring states of Assam and Cachar, Manipuri Muslims are also referred to as Mei Moglai (Mughal Meiteis). A diaspora community in Bangladesh's Moulvibazar District (particularly in Kamalganj) is known locally as Khai Bangal.

== History ==
In the 17th century, Meitei Prince Sanongba requested aid from Dimasa Cachari King Prataphil to defeat his brother King Khagemba. Dimasa king Prataphil was aware of Khagemba's military strength and knew that his forces alone could not win. So, he requested help from the Nawab of Taraf, Muhammad Nazir. Nazir supplied 1000 troops, who were placed under the command of his brother Muhammad Sani. Sani was defeated and King Khagemba imprisoned him and his soldiers. Later, King Khagemba allowed the Muslim soldiers to settle in the valleys of Manipur. Meanwhile, the Burmese army attacked the Kabaw Valley. King Khagemba asked the Muslim soldiers to help the Meitei army. They agreed and fought alongside the Meitei army and were victorious. Khagemba was very happy with that and bestowed the name Pangal, 'strong' on the Muslim soldiers. Through marriage, adoption of the Meitei language and local practices which did not conflict with Islam, the Muslim soldiers were eventually naturalised as the Meitei Pangals.

The Meitei Pangals were result of two Muslim migrations in 1606 and 1724. Manipur provided shelter to Shah Shuja, the Mughal prince who fled (and was pursued) to save himself from the wrath of his brother Mughal Emperor Aurangzeb. According to Henry Rule Kathe, Muslims are the result of intermixing (melting pot) of Muslims coming in different eras from different directions – Bengal, Arakan, Cachar and Manipur itself. Silk-spinning was a trade widely practised by them.

The Meitei Pangals of Manipur devastated and were taken as slaves by the invading Burmese armies.

While some Muslims were already living in Manipur, there was a significant influx of Muslims from 1660 onwards, as refugees followed the deposing of the Mughal Shah Shuja (Shangkusum) of Hindustan, who lost a war of succession to Aurangzeb. Shuja's flight is significant in the Islamic folklore of both north east India and Bangladesh.

On 6 June 1660, Shuja fled from Dacca (Dhaka), initially intent on travelling, via Chittagong to Arakan (Rakhine). Arakan, capital of the Mrauk U Kingdom, was the destination, because Sanda Sudamma had reportedly promised to provide ships to take Shuja and his entourage to Mecca for haj (pilgrimage). Shuja travelled with his wife Piari Banu Begum (a.k.a. Praveen Banu, Piara Banu, or Pai Ribanu) and her sister Sabe Banu, his sons Zainul Abidin (Zainibuddin, Bon Sultan or Sultan Bang), Buland Akhtar and Zain-ul-Din Muhammad (Zainul Abedi), and daughters Gulrukh Banu, Roshanara Begum and Amina Begum, as well as two vessels of gold and silver, jewels, treasures and other royal trappings, on the backs of half a dozen camels, while about 1,000 palanquins (carriers) transported Shuja's harem. After staying for some time at Chittagong, Shuja took a land route (still called Shuja Road) southward. Shuja prayed the Eid prayer at a place called Edgoung (meaning eidgah) in Dulahazra. The part crossed the Naf River, half a mile north of Maungdaw, which is sometimes still known as "Shuja Village". The final leg was a sea voyage to Arakan where Shuja was received by an envoy of king Sanda Sudamma and escorted to quarters provided for him. However, after Shuja arrived in Arakan, Sudama reportedly reneged on this promise and confiscated some of Shuja's treasure. In retaliation, Zainul Abidin and another brother led a Mughal attack on Sudama and almost succeeded in setting fire to the royal palace. Two or three of Shuja's sons died in subsequent fighting and/or the Mughals' flight into the jungle. Many other Mughals were massacred. Shuja's daughter Gulrukh reportedly committed suicide after being captured and raped by Sudama. The surviving members of Shaju's party, helped reportedly by Mughals and Pathans resident at Arakan, travelled north with Portuguese mariners, at a high cost in gold and jewels.

The Hindu kings of Tripura and Manipur were more agreeable hosts – probably because they did not like the expansionist policy of Aurangzeb – and played a crucial role in concealing Shuja's whereabouts. Shah Shuja and his party arrived at Tripura on 16 May, and in Manipur in December . Aware that Aurangzeb’s scouts and spies were searching for the former Shah, the Tripura officials spread misinformation that Shuja had died at Arakan, or was travelling to Mecca, among other stories. Among other precautionary measures, Shuja was sent by elephant to the hill country of Ukhrul. Mir Jumla II learned of the situation and sent three men to Manipur in late December, to detain and retrieve Shuja's family. However, the Qazi of Manipur, Muhammad Sani, detained the chief emissary of the Mughals, Nur Beg to ensure that the others, Dur Beg and Rustam Beg, did not provide information regarding Shuja’s presence in Manipur. At that time, Shuja was in hiding at a cave known later as Shuja-lok ("Shuja Cave"), Haignang, Kairang (east of Imphal). According to some accounts he later died at the cave.

The Manipuri Muslims are the descendants of the soldiers from Sylhet and the local Meitei women. The Meitei Kings of Manipur gave their surnames based on their professions. For example, Fundreimayum was the surname given to those who worked on lathe. Likewise, Chesam was given as surname to those who worked in paper industry.

=== Population ===
Their present population is 239,886, making up 8.40% of the state of Manipur population as per 2011 census. Pangal mostly settled in the periphery of Manipur near River bank, near lake and foothills. The Pangals are mainly concentrated in and around Imphal, the capital of Manipur and Thoubal. There is large number of pangals live in Cachar in Assam, Hojai in Assam, Komolpur in Tripura and Bangladesh. It is believed that the ancestors of the Meitei Pangals settled in this region are migrated from Manipur during the seven years devastation also known as Chahi-Taret Khuntakpa, the black period in the history of Manipur when Burmese invasions of Assam and their conquest of Manipur around 1815 AD.

In 2014, six Islamic books were translated into Manipuri, including one titled Sachcha Deen-1 by Md Abdul Barik.

== Culture ==
=== Dual identity ===
The Meitei Pangal community is distinguished by a "dual identity" — Islamic in faith, yet Meitei in language and many cultural practices. Scholars have described this as a uniquely deep form of indigenous assimilation: unlike Muslim communities in other parts of northeastern India, the Pangals are simultaneously recognised as a component of the broader Meitei community and as practising Muslims. Their native name itself encodes this duality: Meitei (the indigenous Manipuri ethnic group) combined with Pangal (Muslim).

=== Cultural Syncrenism ===
Following initial settlement, the Pangal community was gradually incorporated into Meitei civic life. An administrative head designated the Kazi was appointed by the king to manage the internal governance, legal affairs, and religious organisation of the Muslim community. The Kazi (Sanglen head) presided over Islamic judicial matters and served as the community's interface with the Meitei royal court.

The early phase of Muslim settlement is notable for its syncretic character. Having no mosque for an extended period, the community adopted numerous local customs and traditions:

- Language: Meiteilon replaced Urdu, Persian, and Bengali as the community's primary tongue.
- Dress: Muslim women adopted phanek, khudei, and khwangnam traditional Meitei garments.
- Cuisine: Local dishes including uti, eromba, kangsoi, and fermented fish (ngari) became part of daily diet.
- Architecture: Houses were constructed in the traditional Meitei style.
- Marriage: A blend of Islamic nikah and Meitei customs developed.
- Recreation: Traditional Manipuri sports mukna, mukna kangjei, sagol kangjei (polo), and yubi lakpi became integral to community life.

=== Stratification ===
Sagei (Sub-Clans): Unlike other Islamic groups in India, Manipuri Muslims were assigned Meitei‐style sub-clans (sageis), integrating them into the Meitei kinship network while maintaining Muslim identity.

- The Ayekpam descend from an artist. Ayekpam translates to "the one who paints".
- The Baseimayum descend from a kingdom in Sylhet known as Basa (or Pasha). However, R.B. Pemberton suggests this kingdom was in Cachar.
- The Makak trace their heritage as the founders of the 12th-century Barmaqam Powa Makkah, renovated by the 15th-century Sultan of Bengal Alauddin Husain Shah. They are divided into three clans:
1. The Makakyum Ariba clan are descended from a member of the Banu Makhzum tribe in Makkah.
2. The Makak Amuba clan are descended from Lukhiyarful, who is a descendant of Nurullah Herati, the Subahdar of Kamrup/Shujabad in 1677 - who comes from Herat, Afghanistan.
3. The Makak Angouba clan are descended from Sunarful, who is a descendant of Lutfullah Shirazi - a Mughal officer.
- The Malsam are descended from an early seventeenth-century man called Malsa who migrated to Manipur from the Brahmaputra Valley.
- The Mansam are descended from a seventeenth-century man who migrated to Manipur from the Surma Valley.

=== Marifat tradition ===
Among the Manipuri Muslims, a distinctive devotional song tradition known as marifat is sung. Its themes focus on the glory of Allah, stories from Islam and the Prophet Muhammad, the impermanence of worldly life, and the inevitability of the Hereafter. Although local oral traditions vaguely mention a figure called Niyamattullah—said to possess spiritual abilities and remembered as Ipu Keidongba (“the grandfather who rides a tiger”)—there is no evidence of established Sufi orders (turuq) in Manipur. Marifat today is composed and sung by anyone, and no Sufi rituals or dances are known to have existed in the region.

A representative marifat song reads:

Leita nattedo leiman chanba, taibang meeshu leiman challi; leiman challaba hakchangdubu, mabu kouee ahal haina.

(Flowers are not the only ones that wither, humans also wither; the body that withers becomes old.)

Hakchangee marupti thawainido; dunya nanga kari thoknei; bandada khuda juda natte; khudada banda parda leitedo.

(The soul is the companion of the body; what relation has it with the dunya? Humans have no separation or veil from God.)

Taibangee thourang insangi poloi; punsinadi konba thungde; puba yaroi leihougani.

(Worldly affairs exceed a lifetime; nothing can be carried beyond death; all must be left behind.)

Khalhousi insan meeoibasa; punsigi ipakta taoriba hakchang; thamoida asha puraduna; dunya koina chellamlaga; leiman shingda chankhiniko.

(O humankind, reflect on this: the body moving through life with hopes in the heart will eventually wither after chasing the world.)

Mapugi khudoldi mamal yaode; shariatki lambelda tingkhang leite; tattana shonsi Kaothokloishi.

(God’s gift is priceless; there are no thorns in the path of Shariat; one must remember this constantly.)

Punshigi mari tatkhiniko; ningsha hondraba kabarduda; leiruba tare takkabbur hakchang; nungshiba dunya thadoklaga; pattuna leibak onkhiniko.

(The string of life may break at any time; in the breathless grave the proud body will decay, leaving behind this cherished world and returning to the earth.)

== Issues ==
=== Discrimination ===
Despite the Pangals having a long history in the area, sharing many cultural traits with their non-Muslim neighbors, and generally living peacefully as a minority, they have recently faced episodes of discrimination, marginalization, and Islamophobia from the Manipur government, some politicians and other Manipuris. Stereotypes of Pangals include that they are anti-social and prone to certain crimes like thievery or drug trading.

The 1993 Pangal massacre saw the death of around 130 Pangals and the burning of their homes. Mobs killed and assaulted Pangal men and women and destroyed Pangal-owned commercial establishments. The police were criticized for doing little to curtail the violence or stop the misinformation. The rise of the BJP in Manipur since 2016 has led to a rise of attacks against Pangals. Yumnam Devjit, the son of Yumnam Joykumar Singh, wrote in a facebook post that the Qurbani ritual done during Eid al- Adha "was nothing but training for Muslims to kill."

In September 2018, a Pangal entrepreneur named Mohamed Farooq Khan was lynched by a mob and the video of his lynching was soon spread throughout social media. He was lynched for allegedly stealing a scooter but there has been alternative reports that Khan was wrongfully framed for the theft. This incident had led to local Pangals fearing for their safety.

=== Political marginalization ===
According to a report from journalist Chingiz Khan of The Pioneer, Meitei Pangals have little political representation in the Manipur government and institutions with very few of them holding political office. The Manipur government initially refused to include a Muslim representative during the drafting of the Protection of Manipur People proposed by the State Government on 23 May 2018. The bill was meant to prevent Rohingyas (and certain other migrants) from settling in Manipur. A narrative that was spread during the creation of the bill was that Pangals gave asylum to the Rohingyas and placed blame on them for the perceived offense.

The Pangals generally receive a disproportionately low amount of aid from the government compared to the Meiteis and other groups in the area. The implementation of the KGBV program was established among the Naga and Kukis but not in areas with sizable Pangal populations. Equal access to higher education, healthcare, and employment is considered an obstacle.

According to a piece in Firstpost, Pangals have experienced the loss of some of their land in a more frequent rate after the 1993 Pangal massacre. There was a 2018 incident in where the Manipuri government forced 400 Pangals to leave their residences, alleging that the locals lived in forest reserves and paddy rice areas. The government deployed the police and utilized environmental laws to execute the evictions. The Pangals have not yet been given compensation for these evictions. Advocates have claimed that comparable areas inhabited by Meiteis face much less scrutiny and evictions. Chingiz Khan, writing for Manipur Daily, stated that these actions by the state has encouraged other native groups in the area to threaten Pangals and their businesses to vacate the place.

== Organisations ==
- All Manipur Muslim Organisations Co-ordinating Committee (AMMOCOC) – umbrella body of Muslim groups in Manipur coordinating peace and social justice efforts.
- United Meitei Pangal Council (UMPC) – advocacy group active during communal tensions, working for protection and representation of Meitei Pangals.
- Manipuri Meitei-Pangal Social Unification and Upliftment Organisation (MMSUUO) – works on legal status, identity rights, and historical justice for Pangals.
- All Meitei Pangal Youth Association (AMPYA) – youth-focused organisation promoting unity, cultural preservation, and anti-drug campaigns.
- Pangal Youths’ Defence Council (PYDC) – youth mobilisation platform advocating community safety and Scheduled Tribe status.
- Meitei Pangal Women’s Development Organisation (UMMWDO) – women's group advocating gender rights and historical recognition.
- Meitei Pangal Council / Pangal Students Organisation (PSO) – engaged in social development and part of anti-drug movements.
- Meitei Pangal Khunthok Ningsing Thouram Committee – engaged in peacebuilding and policy submission efforts.

== Notable people ==
=== Politicians ===
- Amjad Ali, MLA Yairipok Kendra in the 1950s
- Ashraf Ali, MLA/Minister of Andro in 1974
- Chaoba Pangal, Politician, MLA, 1970s, Wankhem Constituency
- Mohammed Alimuddin, former Chief Minister of Manipur
- Mohammad Helalluddin Khan, Former Minister from Lilong Constituency
- Sheikh Noorul Hassan, MLA of Kshetrigao
- Nurul Huda, Marxist from Cachar
- Muhammed Alauddin Khan, former Manipur minister
- Yaima Haji, MLA, Keirao Constituency,1970s
- Abdul LatiF, two-time MLA of Mayang Imphal
- Kutub Ahmed Mazumder, Former MLA and Congress politician based in Assam
- Muhammad Abdul Nasir, MLA of Lilong
- Muhammad Fajur Rahim, former MLA of Wabgai
- Habibur Rahaman, former MLA of Wabgai
- Haji Abdul Salam, Former MLA of Wabgai
- Muhammmdin, Former MLA of Khetrigao
- Amin Shah, Former MLA of Kshetrigao

== See also ==
- Meitei people in Assam

Similar communities

- Hui, general term used historically to denote Han/Chinese Muslims
- Kache, generally term used for Tibetan Muslims
- Paxi, general terms for Dai Muslims

== Bibliography ==
- Irene, Salam (2010). The Muslims of Manipur. Delhi: Gyan Publishing House or Kalpaz Publications. ISBN 978-81-7835-828-4. OCLC 1533002219. ISBN 817835828X
- Hui Legends of The Companions of The Prophet, China Heritage,20 Sep 2010, www.chinaheritagenewsletter.org/article.
- Ahmed, Syed (2003). Islam in North-East India: 17th to the 19th Century (PDF). School of Social Sciences (Ph.D. thesis). Supervisor: Yogesh Sharma. Delhi: Jawaharlal Nehru University. p. 237. hdl:10603/16737. Archived from the original on 18 November 2025.
- Manipuri Muslims: Socially Speaking
- Devi, Haobam Bidyarani (2021). Changing Status of the Muslim Women in Manipur. Sunmarg Publishers & Distributors. ISBN 978-93-82606-83-3.
- Kikhi, Kedilezo; Gautam, Dharma Rakshit (22 September 2021). "Pangals in Manipur A community symbolising disadvantaged status in the state". Comprehending Equity: Contextualising India's North-East. Taylor & Francis. ISBN 978-1-000-44266-3.
- Ahmed, Mohd Shakil (1 October 2010). "Understanding Muslim Social Arrangement: The Pangals of Manipur, India". American Journal of Islam and Society. 27 (4): 126–133. doi:10.35632/ajis.v27i4.1300. ISSN 2690-3741.
- Asif, Mazhar; Khan, Md. Chingiz (1 July 2025). "Tracing the Historical Roots of Muslims' Settlement and Migration in Northeast India: A Case Study of Assam and Manipur1". History and Sociology of South Asia. 19 (2): 263–280. doi:10.1177/22308075251321910. ISSN 2230-8075.
- Singh, M. Amarjeet (2021). "Pangals in Manipur: A Community Symbolising Disadvantaged Status". Comprehending Equity: Contextualizing India's Northeast. Routledge. pp. 162–172. doi:10.4324/9781003182726-16.
- Ahmed, Mohd Mustaque; Kumar, Sashin; Borthakur, Sashin Kumar (17 April 2019). "Ethnobotanical Study of Plants Used in Muslim (Pangal/Meitei Pangal) Community Folk-Lore (Folk-Songs and Folk-Proverbs) in Manipur, India". International Journal of Plant Science and Ecology. 5 (1): 1–10. eISSN 2381-7003. ISSN 2381-6996.

=== Based on Other Languages ===
- Ahmed, M. M. (2021). Pangal chanuralaktagi (1st ed.). Imphal: Ruksana amasung sajidana Writer Union.
