= 2024 Batam mayoral election =

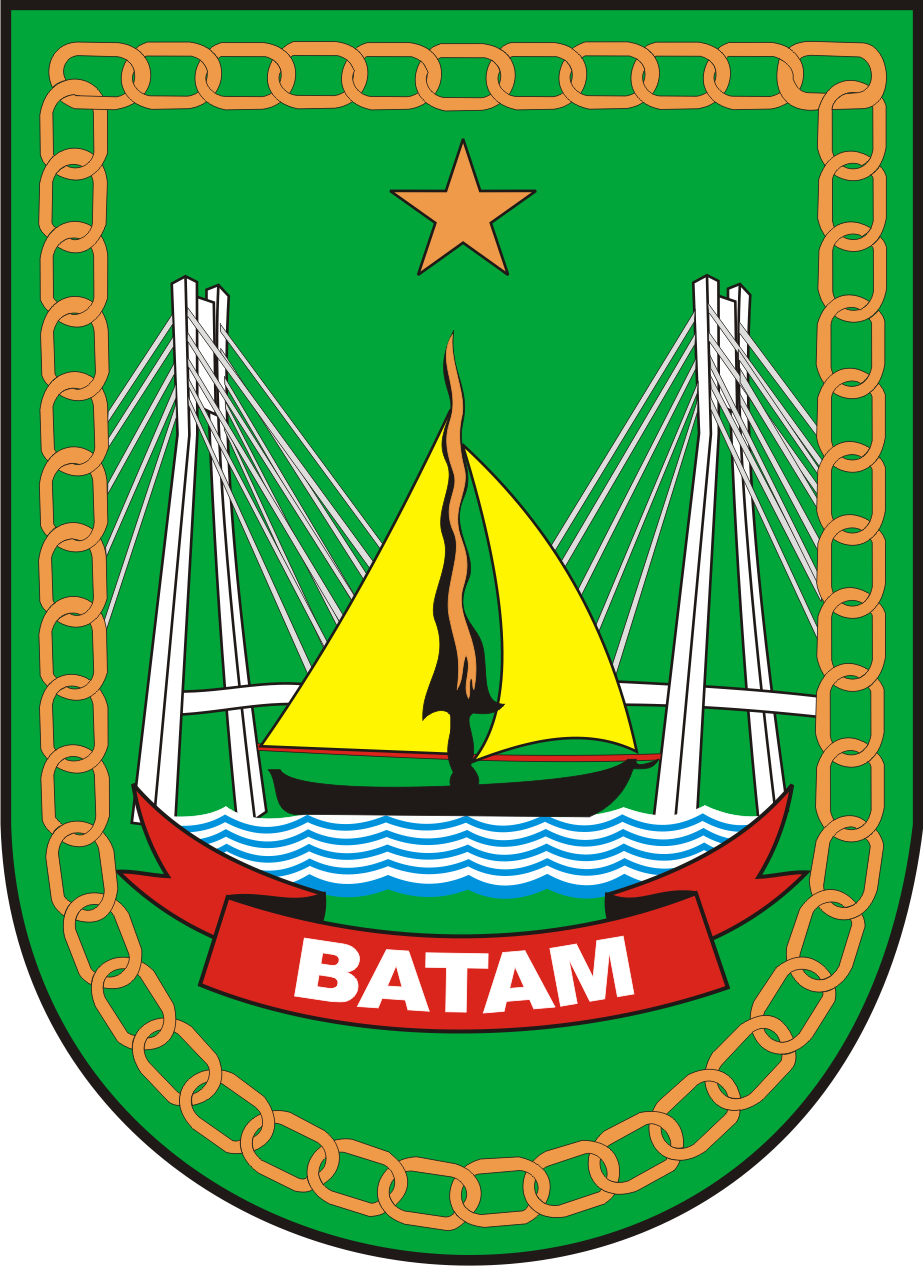
- 27 November 2024
- Turnout: 48.54%
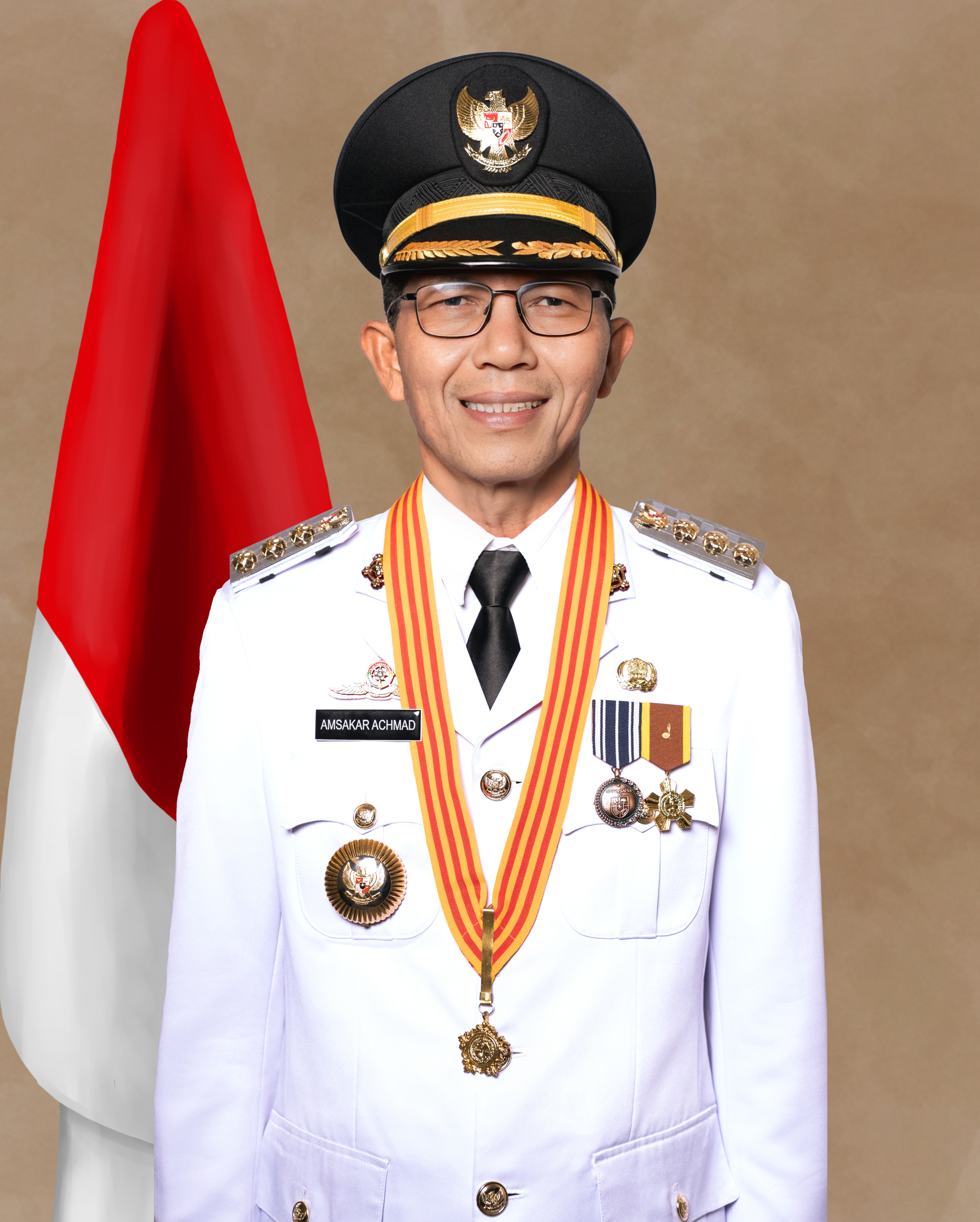

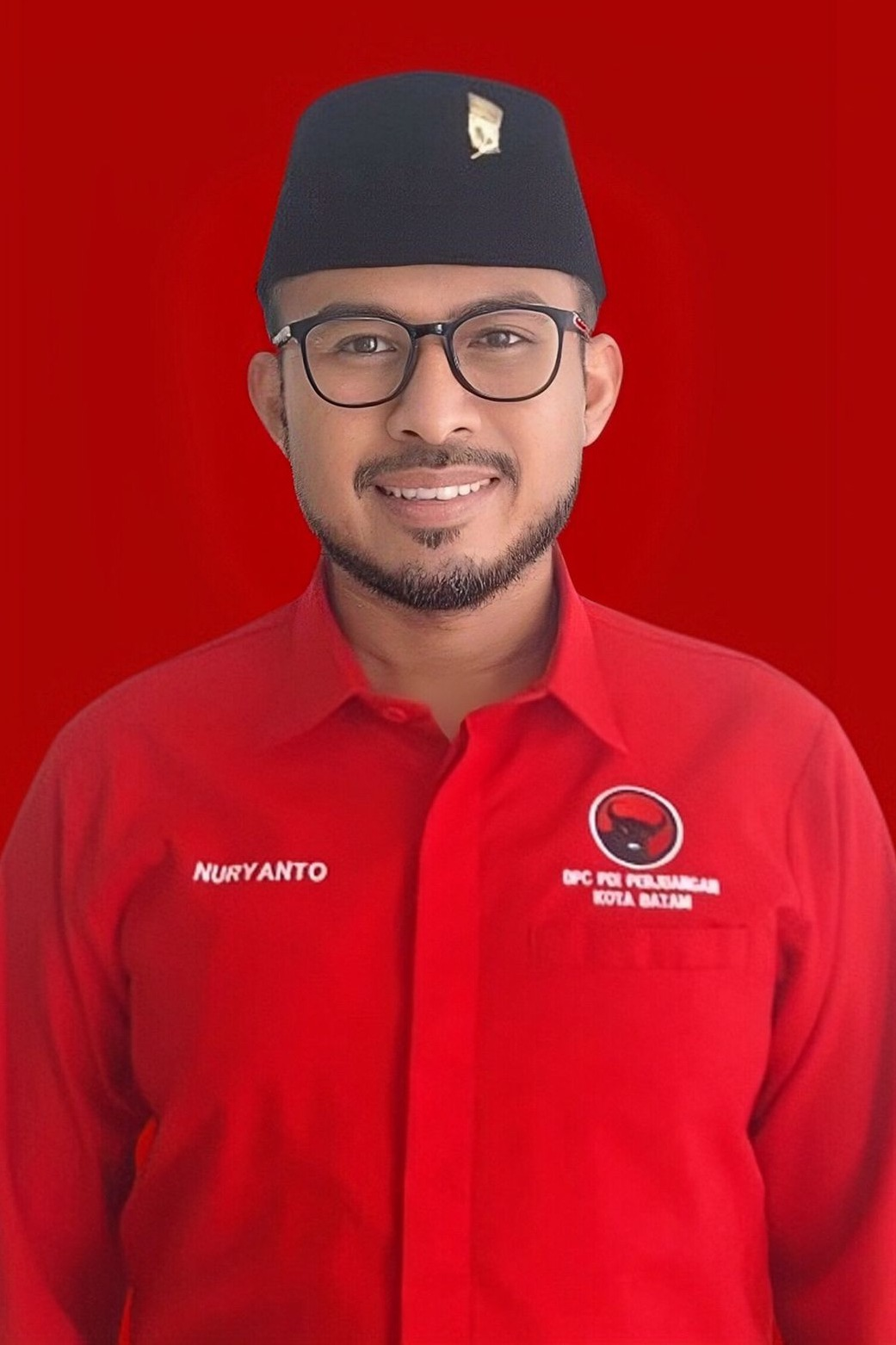
Candidate	Amsakar Achmad	Nuryanto
Party	NasDem	PDI-P
Alliance	KIM Plus
Running mate	Li Claudia Chandra	Hardi Selamat Hood
Popular vote	278,132	143,245
Percentage	66.01%	33.99%
- Results by district and subdistrict (Interactive version)
Mayor before election
Muhammad Rudi
NasDem
Elected mayor
Amsakar Achmad
NasDem

The 2024 Batam mayoral election was held on 27 November 2024 as part of nationwide local elections to elect the mayor and vice mayor of Batam for a five-year term. The previous election was held in 2020. Vice Mayor Amsakar Achmad of the NasDem Party won the election in a landslide, securing 66% of the vote. His sole opponent, Nuryanto of the Indonesian Democratic Party of Struggle (PDI-P), received 33%.

== Electoral system ==
The election, like other local elections in 2024, follow the first-past-the-post system where the candidate with the most votes wins the election, even if they do not win a majority. It is possible for a candidate to run uncontested, in which case the candidate is still required to win a majority of votes "against" an "empty box" option. Should the candidate fail to do so, the election will be repeated on a later date.

== Candidates ==
According to electoral regulations, in order to qualify for the election, candidates were required to secure support from a political party or a coalition of parties controlling 10 seats (20 percent of all seats) in the Batam Regional House of Representatives (DPRD). The NasDem Party, with 10 seats in the DPRD, is the only party eligible to nominate a mayoral candidate without forming coalitions with other parties. Candidates may alternatively demonstrate support to run as an independent in form of a number of photocopies of identity cards, but no independent candidates registered with the General Elections Commission by the set deadline.

Incumbent Mayor Muhammad Rudi had served two terms as mayor and was therefore ineligible to contest the election.

=== Declared ===
Candidate from NasDem and Gerindra
Amsakar Achmad	Li Claudia Chandra
for Mayor	for Vice Mayor
Vice Mayor of Batam (2016–2025)	Member of South Tangerang DPRD (2019–2024)
Parties
21 / 50 (42%) NasDem (10 seats); Gerindra (7 seats); PKB (4 seats)

=== Potential ===
The following are individuals who have either been publicly mentioned as a potential candidate by a political party in the DPRD, publicly declared their candidacy with press coverage, or considered as a potential candidate by media outlets:

- Marlin Agustina (Gerindra), incumbent vice governor of the Riau Islands and wife of Muhammad Rudi.

== Political map ==
Following the 2024 Indonesian legislative election, twelve political parties are represented in the Batam DPRD:

Political parties	Seat count
NasDem Party	10 / 50
Great Indonesia Movement Party (Gerindra)	7 / 50
Indonesian Democratic Party of Struggle (PDI-P)	7 / 50
Party of Functional Groups (Golkar)	6 / 50
Prosperous Justice Party (PKS)	6 / 50
National Awakening Party (PKB)	4 / 50
National Mandate Party (PAN)	3 / 50
Democratic Party (Demokrat)	2 / 50
People's Conscience Party (Hanura)	2 / 50
United Development Party (PPP)	1 / 50
Indonesian Solidarity Party (PSI)	1 / 50
Nusantara Awakening Party (PKN)	1 / 50

== Results ==
Candidate	Running mate	Party	Votes	%
Amsakar Achmad	Li Claudia Chandra	NasDem Party	278,132	66.01
Nuryanto	Hardi Selamat Hood	Indonesian Democratic Party of Struggle	143,245	33.99
Total			421,377	100.00
Valid votes			421,377	96.50
Invalid/blank votes			15,301	3.50
Total votes			436,678	100.00
Registered voters/turnout			899,666	48.54
Source: KPU
