= List of incumbent regional heads and deputy regional heads in Riau Islands =

The following is an article about the list of Regional Heads and Deputy Regional Heads in 7 regencies/cities in Riau Islands who are currently still serving.

== List ==
Regency/ City	Photo of the Regent/ Mayor	Regent/ Mayor	Photo of Deputy Regent/ Mayor	Deputy Regent/ Mayor	Taking Office	End of Office (Planned)	Ref.
Bintan; Regency List of Regents/Deputy Regents		Roby Kurniawan		Deby Maryanti	20 February 2025	20 February 2030	
Karimun; Regency List of Regents/Deputy Regents		Ing Iskandarsyah		Rocky Marciano Bawole	20 February 2025	20 February 2030	
Anambas Islands; Regency List of Regents/Deputy Regents		Dato’ Aneng		Raja Bayu Febri Gunadian	20 February 2025	20 February 2030	
Lingga; Regency List of Regents/Deputy Regents		M. Nizar		Novrizal	20 February 2025	20 February 2030	
Natuna; Regency List of Regents/Deputy Regents		Cen Sui Lan		Jarmin Sidik	20 February 2025	20 February 2030	
Batam; City List of Mayors/Deputy mayors		Amsakar Achmad		Li Claudia Chandra	20 February 2025	20 February 2030	
Tanjungpinang; City List of Mayors/Deputy mayors		Lis Darmansyah		Raja Ariza	20 February 2025	20 February 2030	

Notes

- "Commencement of office" is the inauguration date at the beginning or during the current term of office. For acting regents/mayors, it is the date of appointment or extension as acting regent/mayor.
- Based on the Constitutional Court decision Number 27/PUU-XXII/2024, the Governor and Deputy Governor, Regent and Deputy Regent, and Mayor and Deputy Mayor elected in 2020 shall serve until the inauguration of the Governor and Deputy Governor, Regent and Deputy Regent, and Mayor and Deputy Mayor elected in the 2024 national simultaneous elections as long as the term of office does not exceed 5 (five) years.

== See also ==
- Riau Islands
