= Muhammed Alauddin Khan =

Indian politician

Muhammed Alauddin Khan is an Indian politician from the state of Manipur. He is the Manipur state government minister for Minorities & Other Backward Classes, Rural Development & Panchayati Raj and Science & Technology. In 2002 and 2007, he was elected to the Manipur Legislative Assembly, as the Indian National Congress candidate in the Keirao constituency.

Karam Thamarjit Singh of Manipur State Congress Party defeated him in the constituency in the 2012 Manipur Legislative Assembly election.
