= Tanjung Sauh =

Tanjung Sauh is a port under construction on the island of Batam, within Sijori Growth Triangle and will be able to handle shipments through the Malacca Straits without transshipment from Singapore. This project directly competes with Singapore's ports. It is planned with 4 million TEU capacity, for completion in 2015. It complements Batu Ampar port on Batam, which is being expanded from 2021-2035 for up to 5 million TEU.
