= Riau Strait =

- Selat Riau (Indonesian)
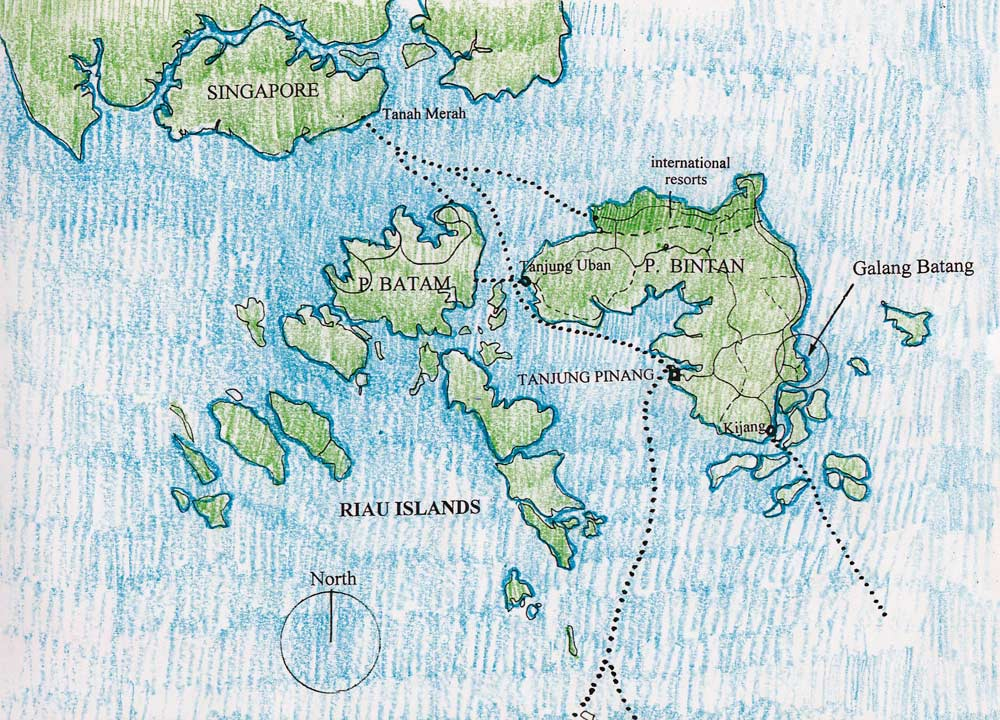
- Commercial waterways through Riau Strait.

- Location within Riau
- Coordinates: 00°50′00″N 104°20′00″E
- Type: strait
- Basin countries: Indonesia
- References: Selat Riau: Indonesia National Geospatial-Intelligence Agency, Bethesda, MD, USA

Riau Strait (Indonesian: Selat Riau) is a strait in Riau Archipelago. The Riau Strait separates islands of Batam and Bintan. It is an important commercial waterway to the port of Singapore.

The planned Batam-Bintan Bridge would be the first bridge to cross the strait.
