= Batam-Bintan Bridge =

Batam-Bintan Bridge Jembatan Batam-Bintan
- Carries: Vehicles
- Crosses: Riau Strait
- Locale: Riau Islands

Characteristics
- Total length: 7,035 meters (23,081 ft)
- Longest span: 536 meters (1,759 ft)

Statistics
- Toll: TBD

The Batam-Bintan Bridge (Indonesian: Jembatan Batam-Bintan), also known as the Babin Bridge (from Batam and Bintan) is a proposed series of cable-stayed bridges crossing the Riau Strait between the islands of Batam and Bintan in the Riau Islands of Indonesia, near Singapore. The cost is estimated at 13.66 trillion rupiah (US$938 million in 2021), which is planned to be provided under a joint government-enterprises financing scheme. As of August 2025, land surveying and the design of the bridge have been completed, but no funds for construction were allocated for fiscal 2026.

Totaling 7,035 meters (23,081 ft), the construction of the bridge will involve three separate sections spanning four islands: from Batam to Tanjung Sauh (2,124 meters (6,969 ft)), from Tanjung Sauh to Buau (4,056 meters (13,307 ft)) and from Buau to Bintan (855 meters (2,805 ft)). If built, it will become the longest bridge in Indonesia. The total length of the toll road will be 14.75 kilometers (9 mi).
