= Muhammad Sani =

Qadi and Chieftain Muhammad Sani
- Other names: Parsena Lanjingland Muhamadani, Mangal Ningthou Sayi
- Occupation: Chieftain
- Known for: Muslim settlement in Manipur
- Spouses: Nongthombam Maitek; Chakpram Melei

Muhammad Sani (also called Parsena Lanjingland Muhamadani or Mangal Ningthou Sayi in Meitei) was a 17th-century nobleman who led the first settlement of Manipuri Muslims (regionally known as Meitei Pangals) into the Manipur Kingdom, what is now the Indian state of Manipur.

After invading the region in alliance with a renegade prince, Sani and his troops were captured by King Khagemba, who integrated them into Manipuri society. Sani eventually became a prominent figure in the royal court and aided in the establishment of subsequent Muslim migrants. He and his family are the ancestors of a number of present-day Pangal clans.

== Historiography ==
The arrival of the Pangal community into Manipur during the 17th century was mainly recorded in indigenous primary sources such as the Cheithalon Kumpapa (the court chronicle of the kings of Manipur), the Nongsamei Puya, and the Pangal Thorakpa. These extensively discuss the initial invasion led by Muhammad Sani, the community's establishment in the region, and the interactions which were subsequently enabled between Manipur and Taraf, where the early Pangals had originated. Further reference to the Pangal settlement is also found in the Ningthourel Lambuba, the Khagemba Lanpha, and the Khagemba Langjei.

However, the history of Taraf (as well as that of the Sylhet region and Bengal in general) is silent about these events. Moreover, it is notable that the descriptions of Taraf provided by the Nongsamei Puya erroneously place it on the banks of the Surma River, which is actually of considerable distance from the former's present-day location of Habiganj District, Bangladesh.

== Background ==
Muhammad Sani is described as a descendant of Mirza Malik Muhammad Turani, a 14th century Persian noble from whom the rulers of the Pratapgarh Kingdom also traced their ancestry. His elder brother, named Muhammad Nazir or Bayazid Karrani, was recorded as the ruler of Taraf in Sylhet, (Note: Historian Syed Murtaza Ali suggests that Bayazid Karrani was identical to Bazid, a ruler of the aforementioned Pratapgarh Kingdom.) with Sani himself ruling territory as a Nawab in the south of that kingdom.

However, given that Muhammad Sani's name is absent from the histories of Bengal, alternative narratives have also emerged regarding his ethnicity and background. The Pangal Panchayat Report of 1932, produced by the Manipuri Muslims' judicial court, included a brief history of the Pangal clans. In this, Sani is described as a soldier from Delhi who had migrated to Baniachung in Sylhet, from where he led the Manipur invasion. Writers Kullachandra Sharma and Badaruddin call Sani a Mughal, while historian Kheiruddin Khullakpam refers to him as a Turk. Researcher Abdul Samad suggests that Muhammad Sani had actually been the brother of the Afghan leader Khwaja Usman, with historian Syed Ahmed adding that the authors of the Nongsamei Puya and Pangal Thorakpa may have made errors with the latter's name.

== Invasion of Manipur ==
In 1606, the Taraf king was approached by the Manipuri prince Shanongba for aid in an invasion against his brother, the reigning monarch Khagemba. 1000 Muslim soldiers were dispatched under Sani's command, in addition to several other military leaders, including his younger brothers Shah Kusum, Sheikh Juned and Kourif Sheikh.

The army invaded Manipur in conjunction with troops from the Kachari ruler Pratap Narayan, who Shanongba had also allied with. They entered the region of Khoupom, with the Taraf soldiers establishing a base on the banks of the Sarel Yangoi River while the Kachari remained on the upper hills. However, upon observing the arriving Manipuri army, the Kachari became intimidated by their military arsenal and retreated during the night, returning to their homeland without informing the Muslims. The latter subsequently chose to engage with the Manipuri alone and in the ensuing battle at Toubul (in present-day Bishnupur district), successfully defeated them. This prompted Khagemba to approach Sani diplomatically, sending his courtier Nongshamei to negotiate a mutual withdrawal of troops. However, upon Sani's agreement, the Manipuri force surrounded the now-unarmed Taraf troops and forced them to surrender on pain of death.

== Pangal settlement in Manipur ==
The defeated soldiers opted (or were perhaps forced) to settle in Manipur, and Sani was allocated fertile territory on the bank of the Imphal and Iril rivers, in what is present-day Moirangkhom Yaiskul, to establish his people. They were given work depending on their respective skills, married to Meitei wives and in time adopted the regions dress, traditions and language, eventually becoming known as Pangals. (Note: Among the suggested origins for this term was that Khagemba, on account of the bravery shown by Sani during the battle, referred to him as panganba and his troops as pangal, with the latter eventually becoming a general term for Muslims. However, most scholars agree that the word was a corruption of bangal, referring to men of eastern Bengal.) It has been generally accepted that this was the first settlement of Muslims in Manipur.

Sani himself received 12 acres of land and two Meitei wives named Nongthombam Maitek and Chakpram Melei. He was favoured by Khagemba and had a privileged position in the royal court. Appointed as Qazi-ul-Qazat (chief judge) of the nascent Muslim community, Sani served the dual role of supervising the judiciary and being a lalchingba (major), leading Pangal soldiers during times of war. He was also one of the Pongba Tara, the ten ministers who assisted the king in administration, and was further entrusted with translating correspondence from Taraf due to his fluency in Bengali and Urdu.

In later years, Sani aided in the establishment of further Muslim migrants in the kingdom. In 1608, Syed Ambiya, Syed Abdullah and Syed Khalka Hussain, brothers of the Taraf king's spiritual advisor Syed Auriya, were honoured and settled by Khagemba on Sani's advice. (Note: Sani's son Ahong was later married to Syed Ambiya's daughter and they became the ancestors of the Tampakmayum clan.) Much later, in 1672, Sani introduced a further 37 Muslims to the then king Paikhomba (r.1666–1697). In return for gifts of gold and elephants, this group was also permitted to reside in Manipur. Among them were Sunarphool, Lukyaphool, Miliya Sheikh, Phuleicha Sandulla Sheikh, Leithou and Sheikh Jali. Many of these individuals are the founders of extant Manipuri Pangal clans.

Sani's descendants subsequently continued to hold a place in the royal court. The present-day Touthongmayum, Khullakpam, Tampakmayum and Chesabam clans trace their ancestry from Sani and his younger brothers.

== Bibliography ==
- Ahmed, Syed (2021), "Mughals In The Historical Narratives Of Manipur", Journal of Namibian Studies, 30 (S2), Hong Kong: Society of Cultural Studies and Social Sciences
- Ali, Syed Murtaza (1965), হযরত শাহ জালাল ও সিলেটের ইতিহাস (in Bengali), Dhaka: বাঙলা একাডেমী
- Choudhury, Achyut Charan (2000) [1910], Srihatter Itibritta: Purbangsho (in Bengali), Kolkata: Kotha
- Irene, Salam (2010), The Muslims of Manipur, Delhi: Kalpaz Publications, ISBN 978-81-7835-828-4
- Khan, Md. Chingiz (2014), "Socio-Cultural And Religious Facets Of Manipuri Muslims During The 17th And 18th Centuries", International Journal of Research, 1 (8), New Delhi: IJR, ISSN 2348-6848
- Khullakpam, Kheiruddin (1997), Turko Afghangi Chada Nouda (in Manipuri), Lilong: Circles
- Kipgen, Tingneichong G. (2010), Women's Role in the 20th Century Manipur: A Historical Study, Delhi: Kalpaz Publications, ISBN 978-81-7835-803-1
- Mangsatabam, Dickson (2024), "Negotiating Muslim Identity and Agency: The Pangals under Eighteenth-Century Meitei Kingship", Proceedings of the Indian History Congress, 83, New Delhi: Indian History Congress
- Nazir, Ahamad (2013), The Muslims in Manipur: A study in their History and Culture, Imphal: Manipur University
- Samad, Haji Muhammad Abdul (2019), Humayun Reza Sohail (ed.), Manipuri Musalmanga mari leinaba Taraf leibakki Wari (in Manipuri), Thong
- Sanajaoba, Naorem (1988), Manipur, Past and Present, vol. IV, New Delhi: Mittal Publications, ISBN 978-81-7099-853-2
- Sharma, Kullachandra; Badruddin (1991), Meitei Pangal Hourakpham (in Manipuri), Imphal: Chingtam Press
