= Muhammad Rudi =

Indonesian politician

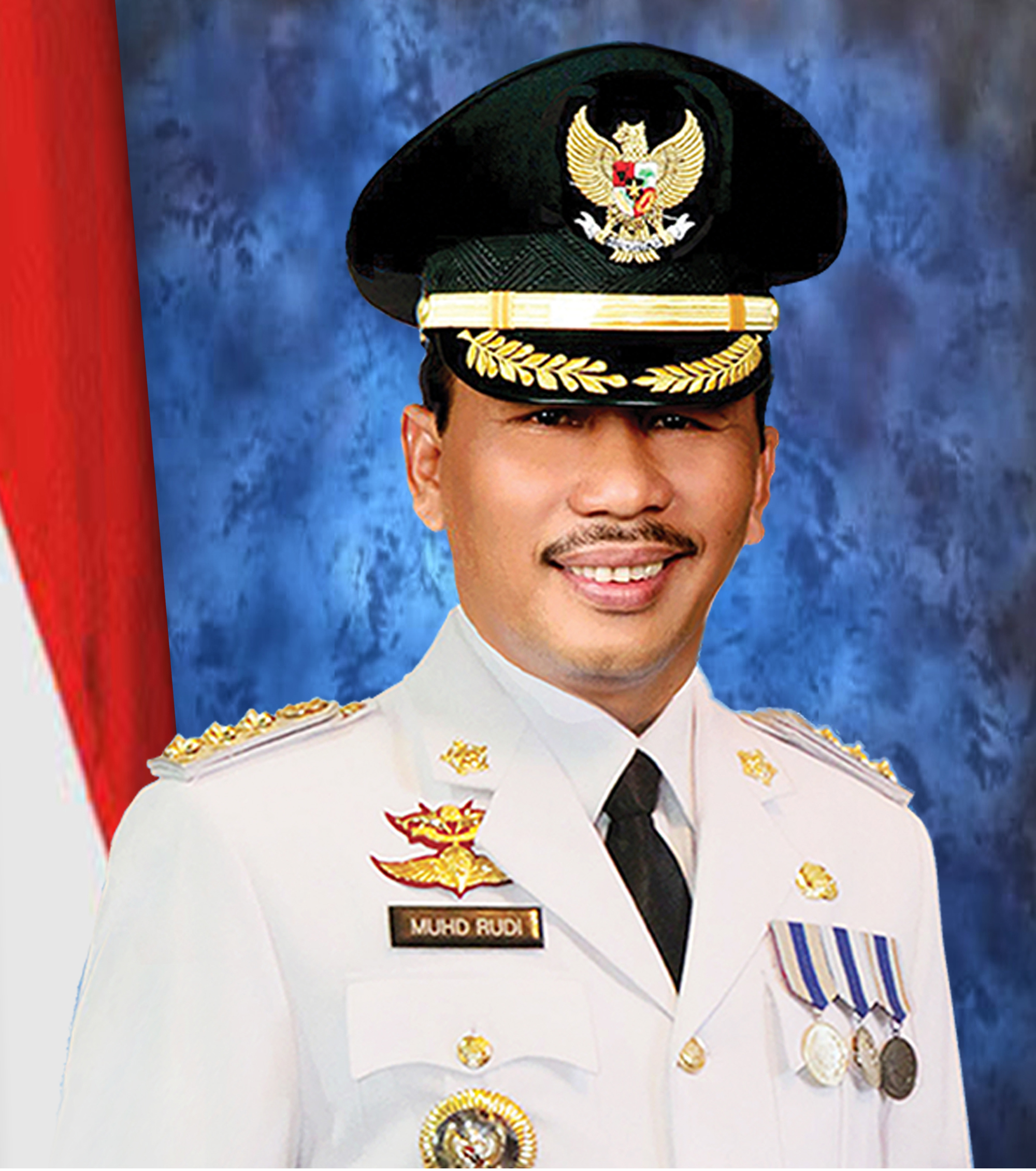

3rd Mayor of Batam
- In office 14 March 2016 – 20 February 2025
- President: Joko Widodo
- Governor: Muhammad Sani; Nurdin Basirun
- Deputy: Amsakar Achmad
- Preceded by: Ahmad Dahlan
- Succeeded by: Amsakar Achmad

Deputy Mayor of Batam
- In office 1 March 2011 – 1 March 2016
- President: Susilo Bambang Yudhoyono
- Governor: Muhammad Sani
- Preceded by: Ria Saptarika
- Succeeded by: Amsakar Achmad

Personal details
- Born: October 20, 1963 (age 62) Tanjung Pinang, Riau Islands
- Party: NasDem Party
- Spouse: Marlin Agustina

Muhammad Rudi (born 20 October 1963) is the mayor of Batam, the largest city in the Riau Islands province after being elected in 2015 where he won 185,845 votes (60.40%) in the 2-candidate race. Previously, he had served as deputy mayor for 5 years. During his tenures in the city governance, he had been member of three political parties: National Awakening Party until 2013, Democratic Party until 2016, and currently he is a member of the NasDem Party. He was reelected for a second term in the 2020 mayoral election with 267,497 votes (73%).
