= Family tree of Selangorean monarchs =

Before the emergence of Selangor as a political entity, ancient settlements existed along all the major rivers between Bernam and Lukut rivers, with two important settlements of Klang and Jeram being governed by princes and chieftains appointed by Melaka and later Johor. At the end of the 17th century, Buginese emigrants began establishing settlements in Selangor. A power struggle in Johor in the early 18th century opened the door for Buginese ascendancy, securing their position by creating the position of Yamtuan Muda in Johor. As their influence expanded, the Selangor region became their stronghold, governed by a succession of Buginese chiefs.

The death of the second Yamtuan Muda, Opu Daeng Chelak in 1745, brought about the power struggle within their own ranks. As his son, Raja Lumu was deemed too young to succeed, the title was passed to his cousin Daeng Kemboja. Raja Lumu was instead given control of Selangor with the assistance of a Suliwatang ('Regent'). By the time Raja Lumu came of age, he began seeking to consolidate his position against his cousin, by breaking away Selangor from the Johor empire. In November 1766, he was installed by Perak's Sultan Mahmud II, as the independent Ruler of Selangor with the title Sultan. The following is the family tree of Selangor, from the establishment of the sultanate in until present day.

House of Royal Buginese Luwu-Opu Daeng Chelak Family

Raja Opu La Madusalat
Opu Ten-ri Burang; Daeng Rilaga
The 5 Buginese brothers
Opu Daeng Parani	Opu Daeng Menambun	Opu Daeng Marewah; Yamtuan Muda Riau^{(1)} 1722-1728	Opu Daeng Chelak; Yamtuan Muda Riau^{(2)} 1728-1745	Opu Daeng Kemasi
Selangor; Sultanate
Daeng Kemboja; Yamtuan Muda Riau^{(3)} 1745-1777	Salahuddin 'Raja Lumu'^{(1)} r. 1745-1778	Raja Haji Fisabilillah; Yamtuan Muda Riau^{(4)} 1777-1784
Raja Ali; Yamtuan Muda Riau^{(5)} 1784-1805	Ibrahim^{(2)} r. 1778-1826	Raja Ja'afar; Yamtuan Muda Riau^{(6)} 1805-1831
Raja; Muhammad Yusuf; Yamtuan Muda Riau^{(10)} 1858-1899	Muhammad^{(3)} r. 1826-1857	Tengku Abdullah d. 1826	Raja; Abdul Rahman; Yamtuan Muda Riau^{(7)} 1831-1844	Raja; Ali; Yamtuan Muda Riau^{(8)} 1844-1857	Raja; Haji Abdullah; Yamtuan Muda Riau^{(9)} 1857-1858
Abdul Rahman II; Riau-Lingga r. 1883-1911	Abdul Samad^{(4)} r. 1857-1896
Raja Muda Musa b. 1844 d. 1884
Sulaiman^{(5)} r. 1896-1937
Member of Selangor; Royal Family
Tengku Ampuan Jemaah; Tengku Ampuan Selangor r. 1939-1960; Raja Permaisuri; Agong II r. 14 April - 1 Sept 1960	Hisamuddin^{(6)} r. 1937-1942 r. 1945-1960; YDP Agong II r. 14 April - 1 Sept 1960	Musa^{(7)} r. 1942-1945
Salahuddin^{(8)} r. 1960-2001; YDP Agong XI r. 1999-2001
Sharafuddin^{(9)} r. 2001-present
Tengku Amir Shah; Raja Muda Selangor

== Bibliography ==
- Ahmad Sarji Abdul Hamid (2011), The Encyclopedia of Malaysia, vol. 16 - The Rulers of Malaysia, Editions Didier Millet, ISBN 978-981-3018-54-9
