= Siege of Malacca (1756–1757) =

1756–1757 siege of Dutch Malacca

| Date | 12 July 1756 – May 1757 |
| Location | Malacca |
| Result | VOC victory; VOC gains Linggi, Rembau, and Kelang |

Belligerents
| VOC; Johor Sultanate | Riau; Selangor; Batu Bara; Rembau |

Commanders and leaders
| Stephanus Elias van Stek; Sulaiman Badrul Alam Shah | Daeng Kemboja; Sayid of Selangor; Alam of Batu Bara; Raja Haji Fisabilillah (WIA) |

The siege of Malacca of 1756 to 1757 was conducted by Bugis leader Daeng Kemboja within the Johor Sultanate against Dutch Malacca. The conflict erupted from a power struggle within Johor, which eventually led to Daeng Kemboja's establishment of a fortress in Linggi. After a preemptive attack by the Dutch East India Company (VOC) took Linggi, Daeng Kemboja returned and laid siege to Malacca. The siege was lifted in May 1757, and Daeng Kemboja reached a settlement with the VOC several months later.

== Background ==
The Bugis held significant influence in the Sultanate of Johor during the reign of Sulaiman Badrul Alam Shah of Johor, which they had sided with against Raja Kecil in a Johor power dispute. Bugis leader Daeng Chelak was named Raja Muda (viceroy) of the Sultanate, and following his death in 1746 he was succeeded by his nephew Daeng Kemboja. Sulaiman would call on aid from the VOC in 1755 to seize Siak, but this produced an enmity from the Bugis against the VOC, whom they saw as a competitor in Johor.

In September 1755, Daeng Kemboja established a fortress in Linggi, in modern Negeri Sembilan on the Malay Peninsula where he established a new government. He also prepared for a war against the VOC, finding an ally in the deposed Siak ruler Raja Alam who was now based in Batu Bara. By April 1756, the forces in Linggi had grown enough to attack Dutch shipping in the Strait of Malacca, and moved to attack the main VOC base in the region, Malacca.

== Siege ==
The VOC attempted talks in July 1756 to no avail, and ultimately opted to attack Linggi on 12 July 1756. The VOC attack on Linggi was successful, causing Daeng Kemboja's forces to abandon their ships and cannons and flee into the interior to Rembau. During the fighting, Daeng Kemboja's nephew Raja Haji Fisabilillah was injured at his thigh. During his time in Rembau, Daeng Kemboja managed to enlist the support of the local Minangkabau people living there. Daeng Kemboja's forces returned to Malacca on 1 November 1756, and soon reached the northern suburb of Tengkera.

Malacca's garrison commander, Stephanus Elias van Stek, deployed some of his soldiers there in addition to Bugis mercenaries and some local militia. Van Stek chose to launch a sortie and he had in the sortie 90 European and 150 Malay/Chinese/Arab soldiers, plus another 90 troops and 50 Bugis mercenaries held back in Malacca. The initial sortie successfully scattered an initial Bugis force of around 300. However, Daeng Kemboja captured a number of suburbs, and built a new fortress in Klebang, where he was joined by Raja Alam and Selangor ruler Raja Sayid. While the VOC managed to repel another assault from the north and east after heavy fighting, Malacca began to run low on food. Raids conducted by the besiegers devastated the outskirts of Malacca.

By February 1757, talks had commenced between the two sides, with Daeng Kemboja demanding that the VOC break its agreement with Sultan Sulaiman (which was refused). Both sides were generally eager to make peace and allow trade to resume. The siege eventually took its toll on the besiegers, until Daeng Kemboja's allies opted to leave. By May 1757, Daeng Kemboja lifted his siege of Malacca and re-established himself at Linggi.

== Aftermath ==
Hostilities remained between Daeng Kemboja's forces and the VOC, but by late 1757 both parties were on the path to peace. However, neither were willing to lose face, and thus a battle was staged in Linggi where Daeng Kemboja surrendered to the VOC to facilitate peace talks. Accounts noted that Bugis actions in the second battle of Linggi against the VOC and Johor forces were "half-hearted". A peace agreement was signed on 1 January 1758 where Johor agreed to cede Linggi, Rembau, and Kelang to the VOC and grant VOC rights to tax tin, while Daeng Kemboja agreed to recognize Johor's sovereignty over the Bugis. Daeng Kemboja returned to Riau, where he focused on economic development and brought Riau to become a major trade center. Fisabilillah succeeded him upon his death, and would die while besieging Malacca again during the Riau War in 1784.
