= Yang di-Pertuan Muda of Riau =

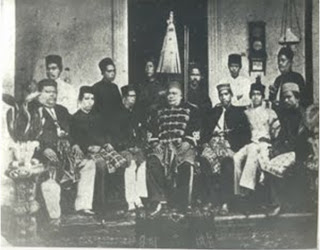
- Raja Muhammad Yusuf, the last Yang di-Pertuan Muda of Riau (1858–1899)
- Creation date: 4 October 1722
- Creation: Johor Sultanate
- Created by: Sulaiman Badrul Alam Shah of Johor
- First holder: Daeng Marewah
- Last holder: Raja Muhammad Yusuf
- Status: abolished
- Extinction date: 17 July 1899

The Yang di-Pertuan Muda of Riau, or Yamtuan Muda Riau, was a hereditary position and the chief official of the Johor Sultanate and later the Riau-Lingga Sultanate.

== History ==
The position of Yang di-Pertuan Muda of Riau was created by the 12th sultan of Johor, Sultan Sulaiman Badrul Alam Shah for Opu Bugis Daeng Lima Bersaudara and their heirs in 1722 after they helped him defeat the 11th sultan of Johor, Sultan Abdul Jalil Rahmat Shah (better known as Raja Kecil) and restore the throne of the Johor Sultanate to him. The Yang di-Pertuan Muda of Riau also reigned in the Riau Islands as his holding territory. The first Yang di-Pertuan Muda of Riau was Opu Daeng Marewah.

According to the Temenggong of Johor Temenggong Abdul Rahman in his conversation with Sir Stamford Raffles in 1819, the Yang di-Pertuan Muda of Riau was the second in power after the Bendahara of Johor (who was also the Raja Bendahara of Pahang) and before the Temenggong of Johor in the hierarchy of the main officials of the Johor Sultanate. However, the Yang di-Pertuan Muda of Riau was seen having more power than the Bendahara of Johor when he acted as the main representative of the Sultan of Johor in matters such as appointing the new Sultan, becoming the regent of Sultan when the Sultan was still a minor and representing the Sultanate in negotiations and agreements with foreign powers such as the British and the Dutch.

The roles of the Yang di-Pertuan Muda of Riau were often in conflict with the Malay officials such as the Bendahara of Johor and the Temenggong of Johor because they felt that their powers had been usurped by the Bugis and the government affairs of the Johor Sultanate had been controlled by the Bugis.

After the Johor Sultanate ended in 1830, the position of Yang di-Pertuan Muda of Riau was retained in the Riau-Lingga Sultanate and was further strengthened by the new status as the main administrator of Riau and the highest dignitary with roles such as Bendahara or Mangkubumi.

The position of Yang di-Pertuan Muda of Riau was abolished in 1899 after the death of the 10th Yang di-Pertuan Muda of Riau, Raja Muhammad Yusuf, and the position was merged with that of Sultan of Riau-Lingga which at that time was held by the 5th and last Sultan of Riau-Lingga, Sultan Abdul Rahman II Muazzam Shah who was the son of Raja Muhammad Yusuf and his wife, Tengku Embung Fatimah binti Sultan Mahmud IV Muzaffar Shah.

== List of Yang di-Pertuan Mudas of Riau ==
No	Yang di-Pertuan Muda of Riau	In office	Sultans	Note
1.	Daeng Marewah	4 October 1722 – 7 August 1728	Sulaiman Badrul Alam Shah of Johor	
2.	Daeng Chelak	7 August 1728 – 15 May 1745	Sulaiman Badrul Alam Shah of Johor	
3.	Daeng Kemboja	15 May 1745 – 30 June 1777	Sulaiman Badrul Alam Shah of Johor (1745–1760); Abdul Jalil Muazzam Shah of Johor (1760–1761); Ahmad Riayat Shah of Johor (1761–1770); Mahmud Shah III of Johor (1770–1777)	
4.	Raja Haji	1777 – 18 June 1784	Mahmud Shah III of Johor	
5.	Raja Ali	1784 – 1806	Mahmud Shah III of Johor	
6.	Raja Ja'afar	1806 – 18 December 1831	Mahmud Shah III of Johor (1806–1812); Abdul Rahman Muazzam Shah (1812–1830)	
7.	Raja Abdul Rahman	1833 – 17 June 1844	Muhammad II Muazzam Shah (1833–1835); Mahmud Muzaffar Shah (1835–1844)	
8.	Raja Ali bin Raja Jaafar	1845 – 23 June 1857	Mahmud Muzaffar Shah	
9.	Raja Haji Abdullah	9 October 1857 – 6 September 1858	Sulaiman II Badrul Alam Shah	
10.	Raja Muhammad Yusuf	7 November 1858 – 17 July 1899	Sulaiman II Badrul Alam Shah (1858–1883); Abdul Rahman II Muazzam Shah (1883–1899)	
