= Temenggong Abdul Jamal =

Abdul Jamal I
- 1st Temenggong of Johor

Temenggong of Johor
- Reign: 1757 – 1802
- Predecessor: Newly Created
- Successor: Tun Abdul Hamid
- Born: Tun Abdul Jamal bin Tun Abbas; 1720; Johor Sultanate
- Died: 1802 (aged 81–82); Pulau Bulang, Kepulauan Riau, Johor Sultanate
- Burial: 1802; Makam Temenggung Abdul Jamal, Pulau Bulang, Kepulauan Riau, Johor Sultanate
- Spouses: Raja Daeng Maimunah binti Opu Daeng Parani
- Issue: Tun Abdullah; Engku Muda Muhammad; Tun Abdul Hamid; Engku Ahad; Engku Yani; Tun Chik; Tun Putri
- House: Bendahara (1720-1757); Temenggong (Founder)
- Father: Bendahara Tun Abbas ibni Sultan Abdul Jalil Riayat Shah IV; Al-Aidaroos
- Religion: Sunni Islam

Temenggong Tun Abdul Jamal bin Bendahara Tun Abbas Al-Aidaroos (1720 – 1802) was the first Temenggong of Johor. He is noted to be the direct ancestor to the current Sultan of Johor and the descendants of the House of Temenggong.

== History ==
Abdul Jamal was born in the Johor Sultanate in 1720 to his father Bendahara Tun Abbas of Pahang, the son of the Sultan Abdul Jalil Shah IV, who died on 21 November 1721.

He married Raja Daeng Maimunah binti Opu Daeng Perani, who was a descendant (House of Royal Buginese Luwu) and subsequent descendants wear the titles of Tun and Daeng.

In 1757, he was appointed by his brother, Sultan Sulaiman Badrul Alam Shah as the Temenggong for the Johor Sultanate. The office would become hereditary among his direct descendants.

He died in Pulau Bulang, Kepulauan Riau in 1802 and was buried there, on a burial ground which would later known as Makam Temenggung Abdul Jamal. His son Tun Abdul Hamid was installed by his grand-nephew Sultan Mahmud Ri'ayat Shah as the next Temenggong of Johor.

== Legacy ==
Certain locations were named after him at Kepulauan Riau:

- Makam Temenggung Abdul Jamal and Masjid Temenggung Abdul Jamal at Pulau Bulang, Kepulauan Riau, Indonesia
- Temenggung Abdul Jamal Stadium and Temenggung Abdul Jamal Indoor Stadium at Batam, Kepulauan Riau, Indonesia

Regnal titles
Preceded by Newly Created	Temenggong of Johor; 1757–1802	Succeeded by Tun Abdul Hamid
