= Raja Haji Fisabilillah Mosque =

Principal mosque in Cyberjaya, Sepang, Selangor, Malaysia

- Masjid Raja Haji Fisabilillah مسجد راج حاج في سبيل الله
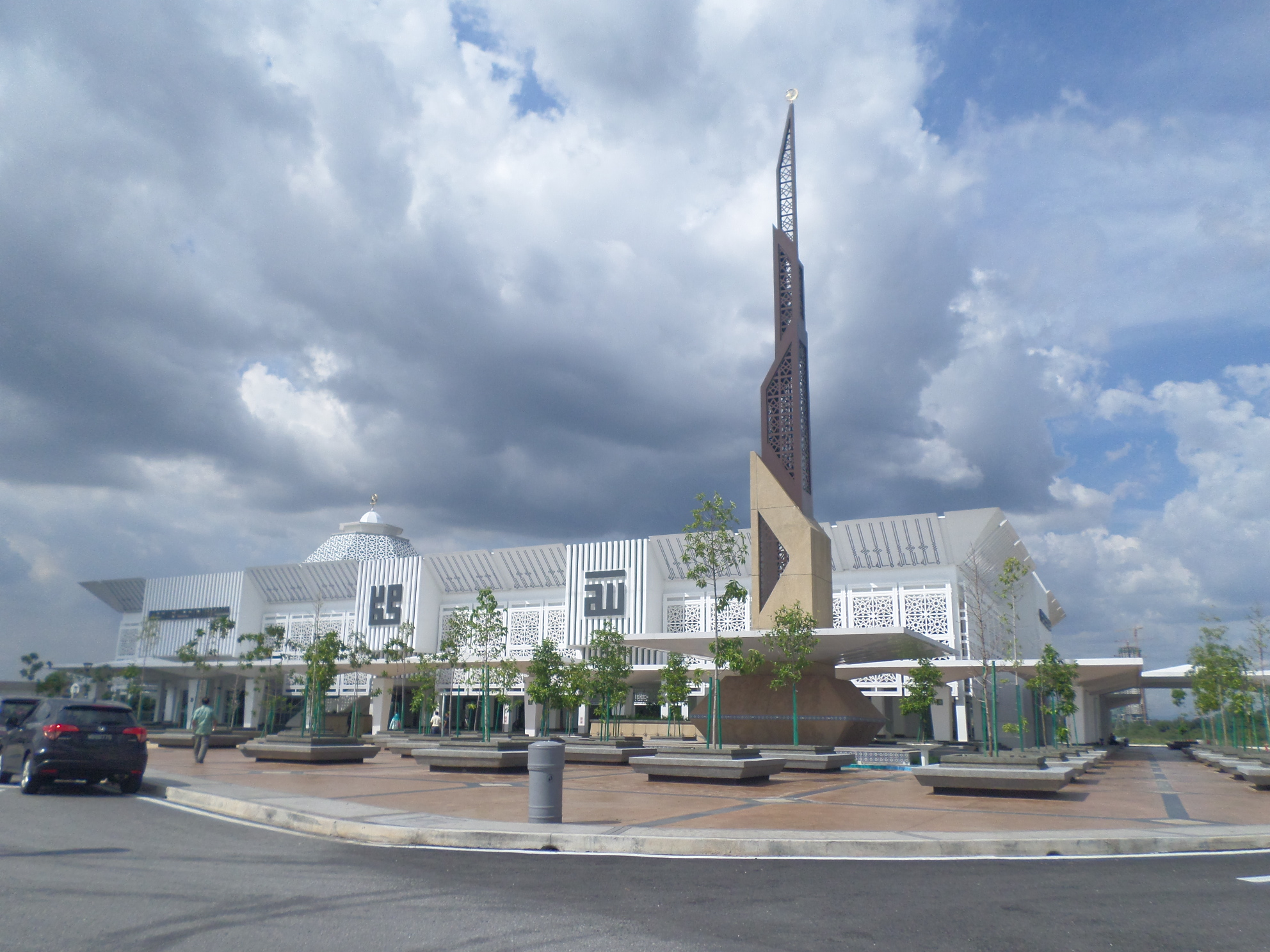

Religion
- Affiliation: Islam
- Branch/tradition: Sunni (Shafi'i)

Location
- Location: Cyberjaya, Sepang, Selangor, Malaysia
- Interactive map of Raja Haji Fisabilillah Mosque
- Coordinates: 2°55′56.8″N 101°38′52.8″E

Architecture
- Architects: ATSA Architects Sdn Bhd (funded by Cyberview Sdn Bhd)
- Type: Mosque
- Style: Modern futuristic mosque
- General contractor: Koridor Padu Sdn Bhd
- Groundbreaking: 5 April 2013; 13 years ago
- Completed: 24 February 2015; 11 years ago

Specifications
- Direction of façade: North West
- Capacity: 8500 people
- Interior area: 7,646.1 m^{2} (82,302 sq ft)
- Minaret: 1

Website
- www.facebook.com/masjidrajahajifisabilillah

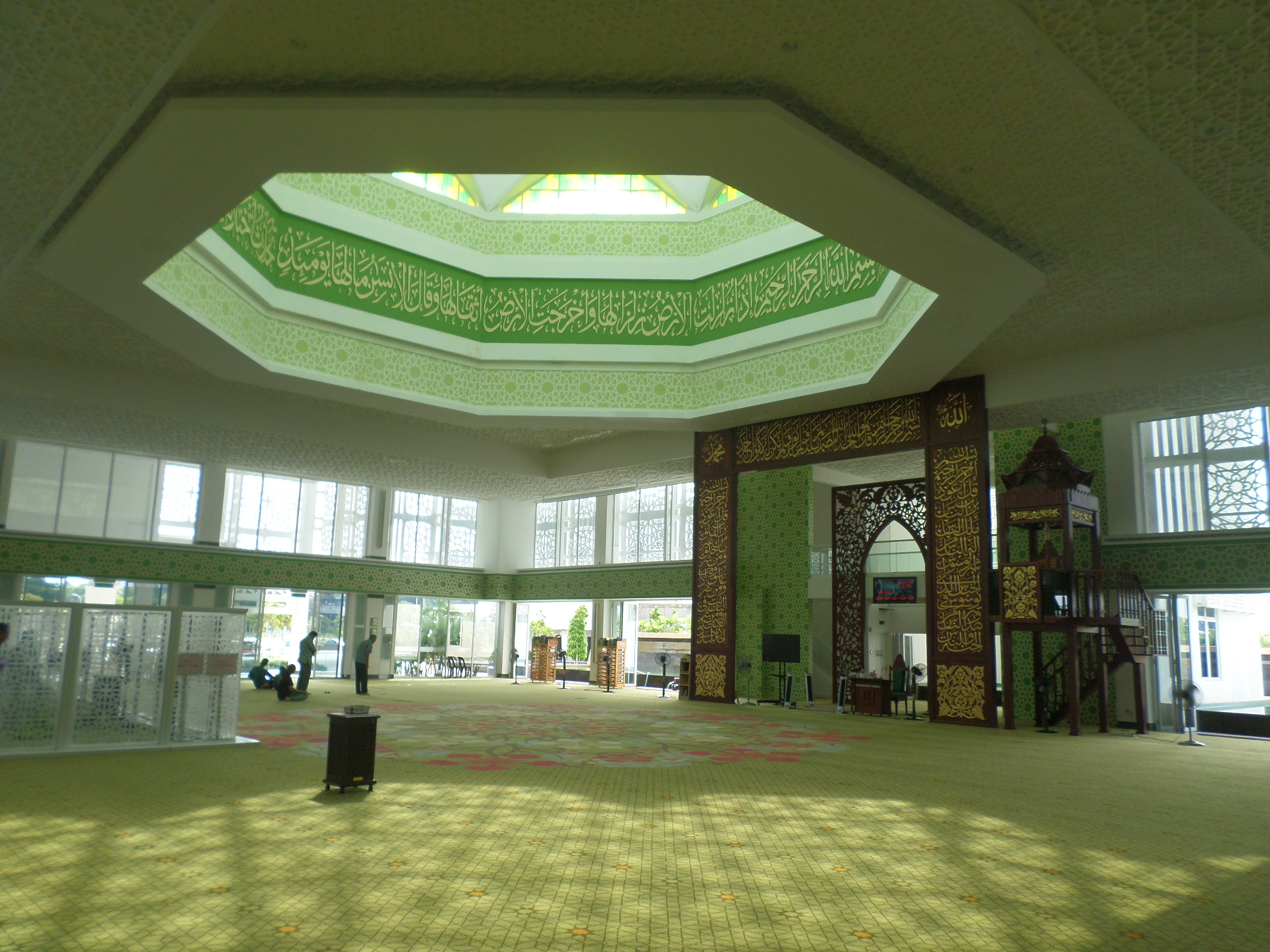
Raja Haji Fisabilillah Mosque prayer hall

The Raja Haji Fisabilillah Mosque (Malay: Masjid Raja Haji Fisabilillah) or Cyberjaya Mosque is a principal mosque in Cyberjaya, Sepang, Selangor, Malaysia.

== History ==
The mosque was constructed from 5 April 2013 and was completed on 24 February 2015. The mosque was officially opened on 22 June 2016 by the Sultan of Selangor, Sultan Sharafuddin Idris Shah in conjunction with the Nuzul Quran celebration on 17 Ramadan 1437 Hijra.

This modern futuristic mosque was named after Raja Haji Fisabilillah ibni Daeng Chelak, a Bugis warrior from Penyengat Island, Indonesia. He was also the Yang di-Pertuan Muda of Riau of the Johor Sultanate from 1777 to 1784.

== See also ==
- Islam in Malaysia
