= Daeng Kemboja =

Third Yang di-Pertuan Muda of Riau

Yang di-Pertuan Muda of Riau
- Reign: 1745 – 1777
- Predecessor: Daeng Chelak
- Successor: Raja Haji Fisabilillah
- Born: 1710; Riau
- Died: 1777 (aged 66–67); Riau
- Buried: 1777; Batangan, Riau
- Issue: Raja Ali
- Father: Daeng Parani
- Occupation: nobleman, warrior

Yamtuan Muda Riau III Opu Daeng Kemboja Ibni Daeng Parani (1710 – 1777) was the third Yang di-Pertuan Muda of Riau who held the position from 1745 to 1777.

== History ==
Daeng Kemboja was the son of Bugis warrior Opu Daeng Parani. In 1745 he was appointed by Sultan Sulaiman Badrul Alam Shah of Johor as the third Yang di-Pertuan Muda of Riau to replace his uncle Daeng Chelak who had died.

Daeng Kemboja also established the deputy position of Engku Kelana and appointed his young cousin Raja Haji as the first Engku Kelana under him from 1745 to 1777. During his time, there was a war with the Dutch in Malacca due to conflict from Sultan Mansur Riayat Shah I of Terengganu.

Due to strained relations between the Bugis and Johor Malays, Daeng Kemboja, along with his family and followers left Riau and settled in Linggi in 1753 and later settled in Pedas, Rembau. He later engaged in a conflict with the Dutch East India Company, besieging Malacca in 1756–57.

During his reign he served under four Sultans of Johor, namely, Sulaiman Badrul Alam Shah (1722–1760), Abdul Jalil Muazzam Shah (1760–1761), Ahmad Riayat Shah (1761–1770), and Mahmud Shah III (1770–1811).

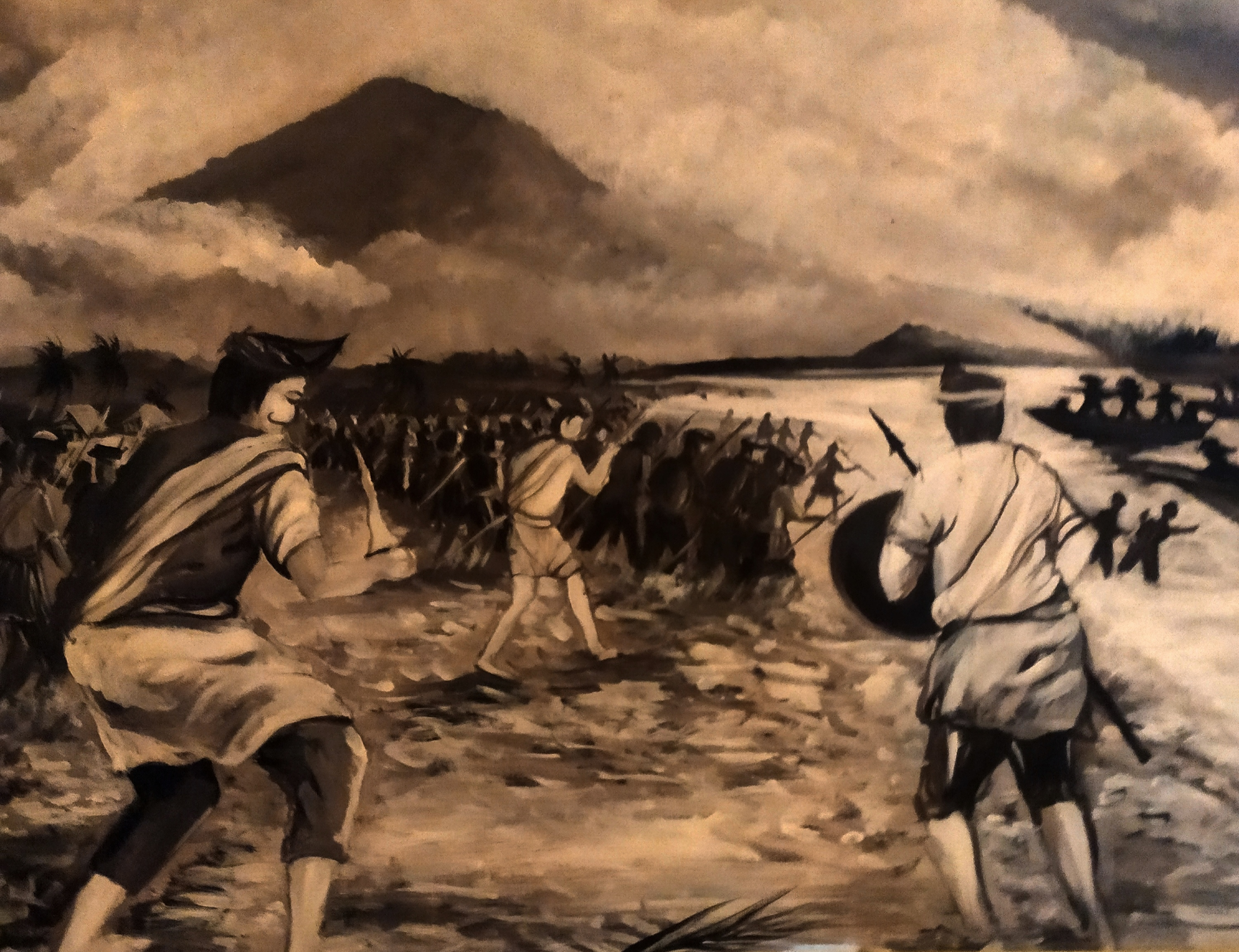
A portrait in the Rembau Museum depicting a war between Raja Melewar and Daeng Kemboja in Naning in 1773.

In 1773, Daeng Kemboja's forces encountered Raja Mahmud's forces from Pagaruyung at Naning. Battle between them ensued, which ended with Daeng Kemboja's forces being defeated, and Raja Mahmud's forces went on to Kampung Penajis in Rembau. There Raja Mahmud was proclaimed the first Yang di-Pertuan Besar of Negeri Sembilan.

== Death ==
He died in 1777 in Riau and was known as Marhum Janggut. He was buried in Batangan, Riau. Following his death, his cousin Raja Haji was appointed by Bendahara Tun Abdul Majid as the fourth Yang di-Pertuan Muda of Riau.

Regnal titles
Preceded by Daeng Chelak	Yang di-Pertuan Muda of Riau; 1745 – 1777	Succeeded by Raja Haji Fisabilillah
