= Daeng Parani =

Early 18th-century Bugis warrior

- Born: Opu Daeng Parani ibni Opu Tendriburang Daeng Rilaka ibni Raja Opu La Maddusila; Luwu, Sulawesi
- Died: 1726; Kedah
- Buried: Kampung Ekor Lubuk, Sidam Kiri, Sungai Petani, Kedah
- Spouse: Tengku Tengah
- Issue: Daeng Kemboja
- Father: Daeng Rilaka
- Mother: Opu Tenribong
- Occupation: Nobleman, warrior

Opu Daeng Parani ibni Opu Tendriburang Daeng Rilaka ibni Raja Opu La Maddusila (died c. 1726) was one of the five Bugis brothers from Luwu, Sulawesi, who established political dominance over the royal houses of Peninsular Malaysia. Daeng Parani became personally embroiled in the politics of the Sultanates of Johor, Riau, Lingga and Pahang in the early 18th century.

== Early life ==
Daeng Parani was the eldest among five sons of Daeng Rilaka and Opu Tenribong; his four other brothers being Daeng Menambun, Daeng Marewah, Daeng Chelak and Daeng Kemasi. As a youth, Daeng Parani was said to have had sex with a concubine of the Raja of Bone, during which he killed a Macassar prince, forcing his entire family to resettle in Riau.

== Involvement in Johor ==
Daeng Parani agreed to assist a Minangkabau prince, Raja Kecil, in overthrowing Johor and its sultan Abdul Jalil IV, the Bendahara (viceroy) who had taken power after the death of Sultan Mahmud Shah II without an official heir. Kecil claimed to be Mahmud's posthumous son. In 1717, however, Kecil attacked Riau without Daeng Parani, and claimed the throne. Abdul Jalil IV's son, Sulaiman Badrul Alam Shah, then sought the help of Daeng Parani and his Bugis warriors. They joined with Sulaiman and defeated Kecil in 1722. Sulaiman installed Daeng Parani's brother, Daeng Merewah, as Yam Tuan Muda (crown prince); under this arrangement, the Bugis were the actual power behind the throne of Johor.

== Death ==
In 1726 while leading a battle against the forces of Raja Kecil in Kedah, when his Bugis warship sailed passed Raja Kecil's fort, he was shot and killed on the ship's gunwale. Enraged by his death, the Bugis stormed the fort and killed every Kedah and Siak people they encountered there.

Daeng Parani tomb is located in Kampung Ekor Lubuk, Sidam Kiri, Sungai Petani, Kedah.

== Legacy ==
Daeng Parani married Tengku Tengah, a daughter of Sultan Abdul Jalil IV. His daughter, Daeng Khadijah, was married to the eldest son of Raja Kecil.

His son Daeng Kemboja succeed his brother Daeng Chelak as the third Yang Dipertuan Muda of Riau in 1745.

His descendants through Tun Abdul Jamal (a maternal grandson of Daeng Parani), son of Bendahara Tun Abbas, gradually became the rulers of Johor during the 19th century.

== Family ==
Upu Tenribong	Daeng Rilaka
Daeng Parani	Daeng Marewah	Daeng Chelak
Bendahara dynasty
Daeng Kemboja	Daeng Maimuna	Temenggong; Abdul Jamal	Raja Lumu	Raja Haji Fisabilillah
Temenggongs of Johor	Raja Ali Haji
