= Yang di-Pertuan =

Yang di-Pertuan may refer to:

- Yang di-Pertuan Agong, constitutional monarch and head of state of Malaysia
- Yang di-Pertuan Besar, a royal title
- Yang di-Pertuan Muda, the regent of state or the crown prince
- Yang di-Pertuan Negara, a title for the head of state in certain Malay-speaking countries
