= Mahmud Shah III of Johor =

Former Sultan of Johor (r. 1756–1811)

Mahmud Shah III محمود شاه

Sultan of Johor
- Reign: 1770–1811
- Predecessor: Ahmad Riayat Shah
- Successor: Abdul Rahman Muazzam Shah
- Born: 24 March 1756; Hulu Riau
- Died: 1811 (aged 55); Daik, Lingga
- Issue: Hussein Shah of Johor; Abdul Rahman Muazzam Shah of Johor
- House: Bendahara dynasty
- Father: Abdul Jalil Muazzam Shah
- Religion: Sunni Islam

Mahmud Ri’ayat Shah Zilu’llah fil’Alam Khalifat ul-Muminin ibni al-Marhum Sultan ‘Abdu’l Jalil Shah (Malay: محمود رعایة شاه ظل‌ الله في العالم خلیفة المؤمنين ابن المرحوم سلطان عبد الجلیل شاه, 24 March 1756 – 1811) was the 17th Sultan of Johor and Johor's dependencies who reigned from 1770 to 1811. Exercising little power over the sultanate where actual power was held under the Bugis court faction, the Tuhfat al-Nafis nevertheless mentions him as an able statesman who did what he could against insurmountable odds, while Abdullah Abdul Kadir attests to his good character.

== Early life ==
Born on 24 March 1756, Mahmud Shah III was the younger son of the 13th Sultan of Johor, Abdul Jalil Muazzam Shah by his second wife, Tengku Puteh binti Daeng Chelak. To maintain their de facto control of the Johor Empire, the Bugis continued to install puppet rulers on the throne, including the infant grandson of Sulaiman Badrul Alam Shah, Mahmud Shah III, who became Sultan on the death of his elder brother, Ahmad Riayat Shah in 1770.

== Treaty with the Dutch ==
During the early part of his reign, the office of Yamtuan Muda was held by the powerful Bugis chief, Daeng Kemboja. Mahmud Shah III came of age at a time when Bugis-Dutch trade rivalry was intensifying. He exploited the rivalry by concluding a treaty of protection with Dutch East India Company on board the Utrecht on 10 November 1784 in which he was accorded the style of 'Most Serene Prince' (Doorlugtigen Vorst). This was signed after the Bugis had been defeated in the preceding Riau War of 1783–1784.

The treaty called for the end of the Bugis monopoly over the office of Yamtuan Muda and prohibited other Bugis from holding office within Johor's administration. It also demanded the expulsion of all Bugis not born or bred in Riau. Additionally, the treaty allowed the Dutch to post a Resident in Johor. Shortly thereafter. Mahmud Shah III retreated to Pahang. All-out conflict soon erupted between the Dutch and the Bugis. Hostilities continued until 1795, when the Dutch succeeded in ousting the Bugis chief, Raja Ali from Riau, allowing Mahmud Shah III to return to his capital.

== Return of the Bugis dominance ==
The same year, the Netherlands came under French occupation and the Dutch allowed the British to temporarily take over their territories in the Malay world. This enabled Raja Ali to make a comeback. After the Bugis ousted Tengku Muda, the Malay Yamtuan Muda of Johor, Mahmud Shah III had no choice but to accept Raja Ali's return in 1803. To appease both the Bugis and Tengku Muda, the Sultan married his son, Tengku Hussein, to Tengku Muda's daughter, while his other son, Tengku Abdul Rahman, was made Raja Ali's ward. To maintain his distance from the Bugis, Mahmud Shah III established his capital at Daik, Lingga.

== Dissolution of Johor ==
By the early 19th century, Pahang and Riau-Lingga began to break away from Johor. Based in Lingga, Mahmud Shah III exercised little power over the Johor Sultanate. This enabled the emergence of a number of powerful chiefs from the same family, such as Temenggong Abdul Rahman (great great grandson of Abdul Jalil Shah IV, second cousins once removed to Mahmud Shah III) and Tun Abdul Majid (grandson of Abdul Jalil Shah IV and first cousins once removed to Mahmud Shah III). Installed in 1806, the Temenggong had de facto control over the Johor mainland, Singapore and the islands in the Riau Archipelago. While in Pahang, Bendahara Tun Abdul Majid became increasingly independent and began carrying the title 'Raja Bendahara' ('King Grand Vizier') of the dominion, following the weakening control from the capital.

This development had resulted in the sultanate's constituent parts effectively becoming principalities, and the cultural unity that had existed between the Malay Peninsula and the islands of Riau-Lingga gradually being destroyed.

== Death ==
Mahmud Shah III died at Fort Tanna, Bukit Chengah, Lingga on 12 January 1811 and was buried at Masjid Jamie', Daik, Lingga. He died without having named a successor.

A succession dispute arose between his sons which later ended when the Bugis seized the throne for his younger son, Tengku Abdul Rahman and crowned him in Riau as the next sultan.

== Bibliography ==
Mahmud Shah III of Johor Bendahara dynasty Born: 1756 Died: 1811
Regnal titles
Preceded by Ahmad Riayat Shah	Sultan of Johor; 1770–1811	Succeeded by Abdul Rahman I

- Ahmad Sarji Abdul Hamid (2011), The Encyclopedia of Malaysia, vol. 16 - The Rulers of Malaysia, Editions Didier Millet, ISBN 978-981-3018-54-9
