= Penyengat Island =

Island in Riau Islands, Indonesia

Coordinates: 0°55′40″N 104°25′03″E

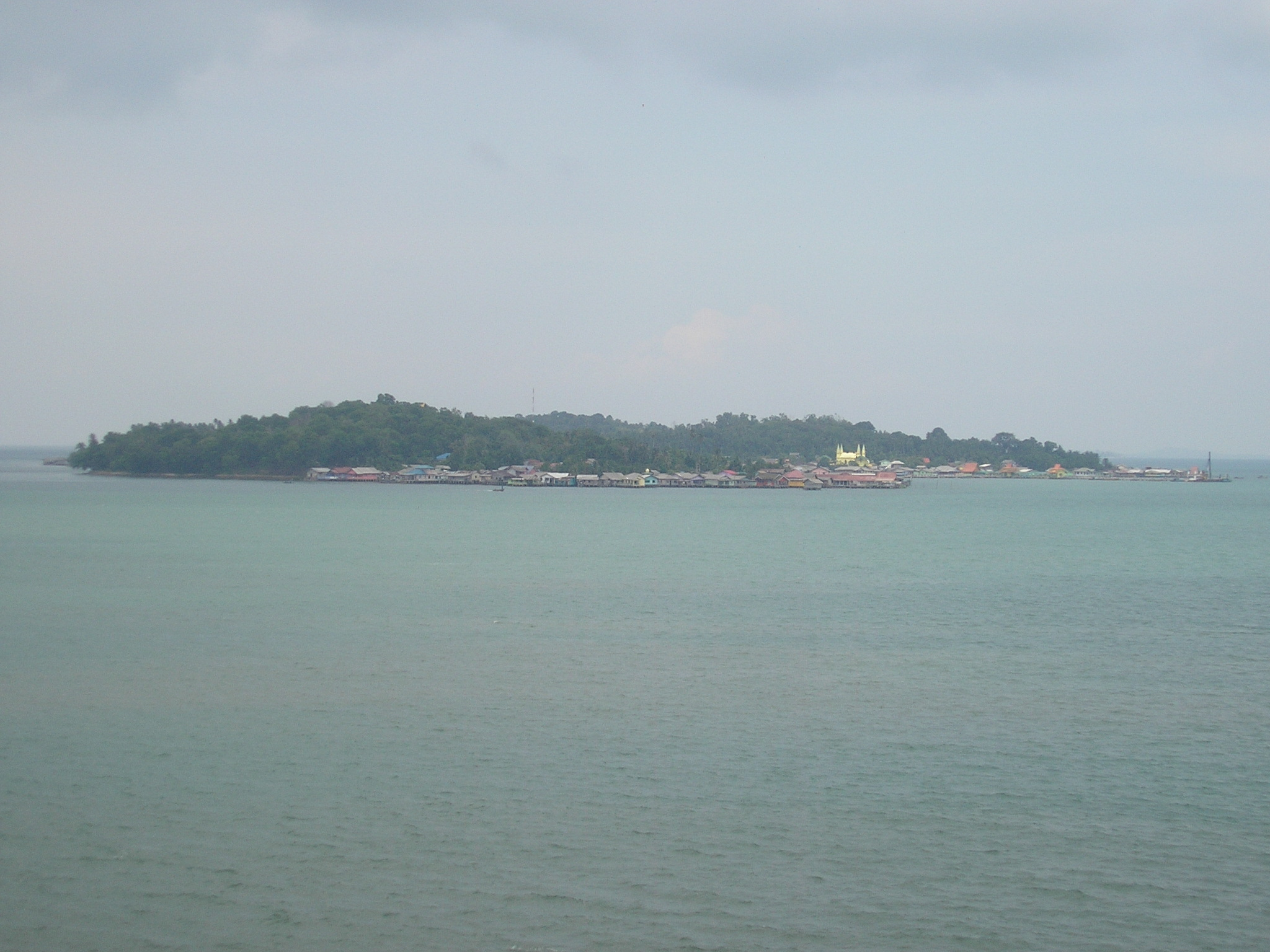
Penyengat Island

Penyengat Island (Indonesian: Pulau Penyengat, lit. 'wasp island') is an island close to Tanjung Pinang, capital of the Riau Islands, Indonesia.

== Background ==
It lies just off Bintan Island, close to the downtown of Tanjung Pinang. The island has historical significance, dating back to the 18th century, when it was established as a fort as part of the Sultanate of Johor-Riau by the Bugis people. It is a small island that is approximately 6 km from the downtown of Tanjung Pinang, Riau Islands province. This island measures approximately 2500 meters x 750 meters, and is approximately 35 km from the island of Batam. This island can be reached by using a boat or better known by pompong boat. By using pompong boat, it takes approximately 15 minutes drive.

Penyengat Island is a tourist attraction in Riau Islands. A few landmarks that may be visited are the Sultan Riau Great Mosque that is made from egg whites, the tombs of the Kings, the tombs of the national heroes Raja Haji Fisabilillah and Raja Ali Haji, the Palace complex and blockhouse Office at Kursi Hill.

During the reign of the Sultan of Riau, this island was used as headquarters by them. It can be seen from the many historical relics of the past. Aside from being the headquarters of the government, the island was also a fortress forefront in retaliating Dutch attacks.

The evidence from the center of defense during the war can be seen from the presence of a fort on the hill, known as Bukit Kursi. As a center of defense, it has some cannons that face the sea.
