= Daeng Marewah =

First Yang di-Pertuan Muda of Riau

Yang di-Pertuan Muda of Riau
- Reign: 1722 – 7 August 1728
- Predecessor: Newly Created
- Successor: Daeng Chelak
- Born: Luwu, Sulawesi
- Died: 7 August 1728
- Buried: 1728; Sungai Baru, Riau
- Father: Daeng Rilaka
- Mother: Opu Tenribong
- Occupation: nobleman, warrior

Almarhum Yamtuan Muda Riau I Sultan Alauddin Riayat Shah ibni Almarhum La Tenri Borong Opu Daeng Rilakka, Yamtuan Muda Riau I Opu Daeng Marewah was the first Yang di-Pertuan Muda of Riau who held the position from 1722 to 7 August 1728.

Daeng Marewah was the third among five Bugis sons of Daeng Rilaka and Opu Tenribong from Luwu, Sulawesi; his four other brothers being Daeng Parani, Daeng Menambun, Daeng Chelak and Daeng Kemasi.

After winning the war against Raja Kecil, Daeng Marewah was appointed by the Sultan of Johor Sulaiman Badrul Alam Shah as the first Yang di-Pertuan Muda of Riau in 1722.

He died while inspecting Pulau Pitung on 7 August 1728, and his body was brought back to be buried in Sungai Baru, Riau and was called Marhum Sungai Baru. His younger brother Daeng Chelak was appointed by Sultan Sulaiman Badrul Alam Shah as the second Yang di-Pertuan Muda of Riau.

Regnal titles
Preceded by Newly Created	Yang di-Pertuan Muda of Riau; 1722–1728	Succeeded by Daeng Chelak
