= Ahmad Riayat Shah of Johor =

Ahmad Riayat Shah أحمد رعاية شاه
- Sultan of Johor
- Reign: 1761–1770
- Predecessor: Abdul Jalil Muazzam Shah
- Successor: Mahmud Shah III
- Born: 1752
- Died: 1770 (aged 17–18); Kuala Selangor
- Burial: Batangan, Riau
- House: Bendahara dynasty
- Father: Abdul Jalil Muazzam Shah
- Religion: Sunni Islam

Paduka Sri Sultan ‘Ahmad I Ri’ayat Shah Zilu’llah fil’Alam Khalifat ul-Muminin ibni al-Marhum Sultan ‘Abdu’l Jalil (1752–1770) was the 16th Sultan and Yang di-Pertuan Besar of Johor and Pahang and their dependencies who reigned from 1761 to 1770.

== History ==
He was the elder son of the 13th Sultan of Johor, Abdul Jalil Muazzam Shah by his second wife, Tengku Puteh binti Daeng Chelak, third daughter of Yamtuan Muda of Riau, Daeng Chelak. He became sultan on the death of his father on January 29, 1761 and was crowned in February 1761 at the age of nine. Because of his young age at the time of his ascension, Ahmad Riayat Shah reigned under a Council of Regency. He died of poisoning in 1770, possibly by a Bugis chief, at Bulang, Riau and was buried in Batangan.

He was succeeded by his younger brother, Mahmud Shah III.

Ahmad Riayat Shah of Johor Bendahara dynasty Born: 1752 Died: 1770
Regnal titles
Preceded by Abdul Jalil Muazzam Shah	Sultan of Johor; 1761–1770	Succeeded by Mahmud Shah III
