= Yang di-Pertuan Muda =

Malay term for Young Lord

Yang di-Pertuan Muda or Yamtuan Muda (Malay: Yang di-Pertuan Muda, lit. "He Who Is Made the Young Lord") is a title given to the regent of state or the crown prince in parts of the Malay Archipelago.

== History ==
The title of Yang di-Pertuan Muda was used by the Old Johor Sultanate before 1722 for the crown prince, i.e the male heir to the throne. Examples of the use of this title by the Old Johor Sultanate included: Raja Bajau ibni Sultan Abdullah Ma'ayat Shah, the Yang di-Pertuan Muda of Pahang; Tun Mahmud ibni Bendahara Tun Habib Abdul Majid, the Yang di-Pertuan Muda of Daik; and Tengku Nong Omar ibni Tengku Abdul Jalil ibni Sultan Hussein Muhammad Shah, the Yang di-Pertuan Muda of Kesang.

Other Malay sultanates have also used the title of Yang di-Pertuan Muda, including the Sultanate of Siak and the Sultanate of Indragiri. The Sultanate of Terengganu, founded by the descendants of the Bendahara dynasty of Johor, still uses the title to this day.

A well-known holder of the title was the Yang di-Pertuan Muda of Riau, held exclusively by the Bugis nobility, reigned as a deputy ruler, underking or viceroy over the Riau Islands as a holding territory under the Sultan of Johor during the Johor Sultanate from 1722 to 1824, as well as under the Sultan of Riau-Lingga during the Riau-Lingga Sultanate from 1824 to 1899.
