= Raja Haji Fisabilillah =

Bugis-Malay warrior (1727–1784)

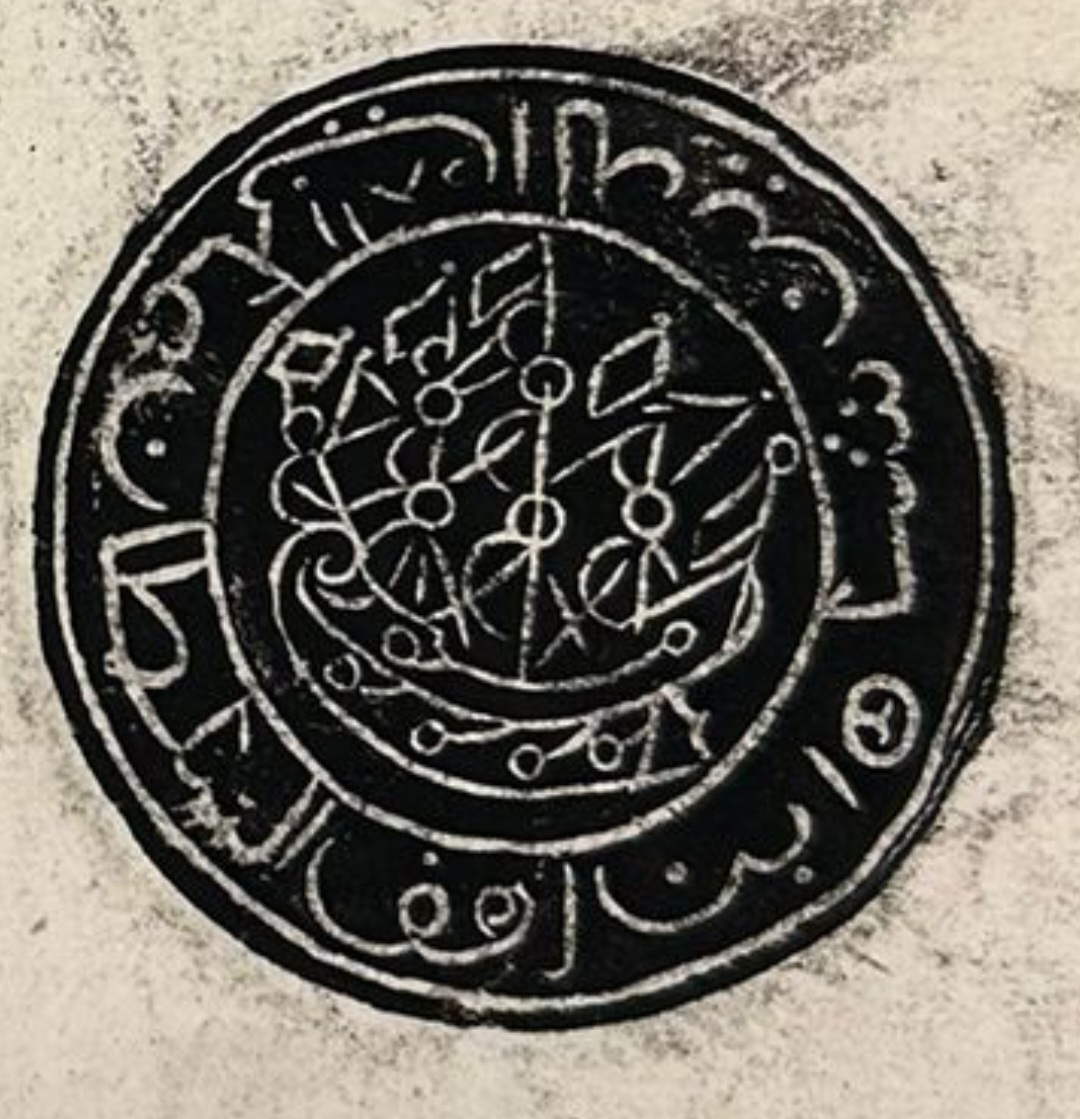

Yang di-Pertuan Muda of Riau
- Reign: 1777 – 1784
- Predecessor: Daeng Kemboja
- Successor: Raja Ali
- Full name: Raja Haji Fisabilillah ibni Daeng Chelak
- Born: 1727; Ulusungai, Riau
- Died: 18 June 1784 (aged 56–57); Teluk Ketapang, Malacca
- Buried: Bukit Kursi, Penyengat Island, Riau
- Issue: Raja Ja'afar
- Father: Daeng Chelak
- Occupation: nobleman, warrior

Raja Haji Fisabilillah (full name Raja Haji Fisabilillah ibni Daeng Chelak) (1727 – 18 June 1784) was a Bugis-Malay warrior, and also the 4th Yang di-Pertuan Muda of Riau from 1777 to 1784.

== History ==
Born in Ulusungai, Riau in 1727 to the Bugis warrior Daeng Chelak, Raja Haji was a younger brother of Raja Lumu.

Raja Haji helped put together the recently fragmented territory of Johor. Known as a great hero by the Tuhfat al-Nafis, from 1760 he coerced the rulers of Jambi and Indragiri and married their daughters, while forcing Sultan Mahmud II of Perak to allow the marriage of his niece to Raja Haji's brother Raja Lumu in 1766, who later became Sultan Salehuddin Shah of Selangor.

In 1771 he also became a kingmaker, installing his preferred person, Syarif Abdurrahman Alkadrie, to be crowned the 1st sultan of Pontianak. He defeated the Siak Sultanate and was widely feared by the Dutch. Former Dutch Governor of Malacca Thomas Schippers in 1773 secured a plan to prevent the strength of Raja Haji's pirate bands.

After his uncle Daeng Kemboja died around December 1777, Raja Haji was immediately appointed by Bendahara Tun Abdul Majid as the 4th Yang di-Pertuan Muda of Riau. Tun Abdul Majid sent a letter to Sultan Mahmud Ri’ayat Shah regarding this news and received a good response from the Dutch Governor of Malacca, Pieter Gerardus de Bruijn, who sent a letter on 28 December of the same year.

The Dutch, fearful of an invasion of Riau, (the Bugis fought the Dutch in Malacca to a standstill back in 1757) they invaded it in 1784 and triggering the Riau War. Securing no victory, the Dutch had to call off their siege after three long months. Once the Dutch returned to Malacca, they found out that the city was invaded by the combined Selangor and Bugis factions. The Dutch national fleet had to be called for backup which eventually led to Raja Haji's death and a major dispersal of Bugis around the Riau islands.

== Death and burial ==
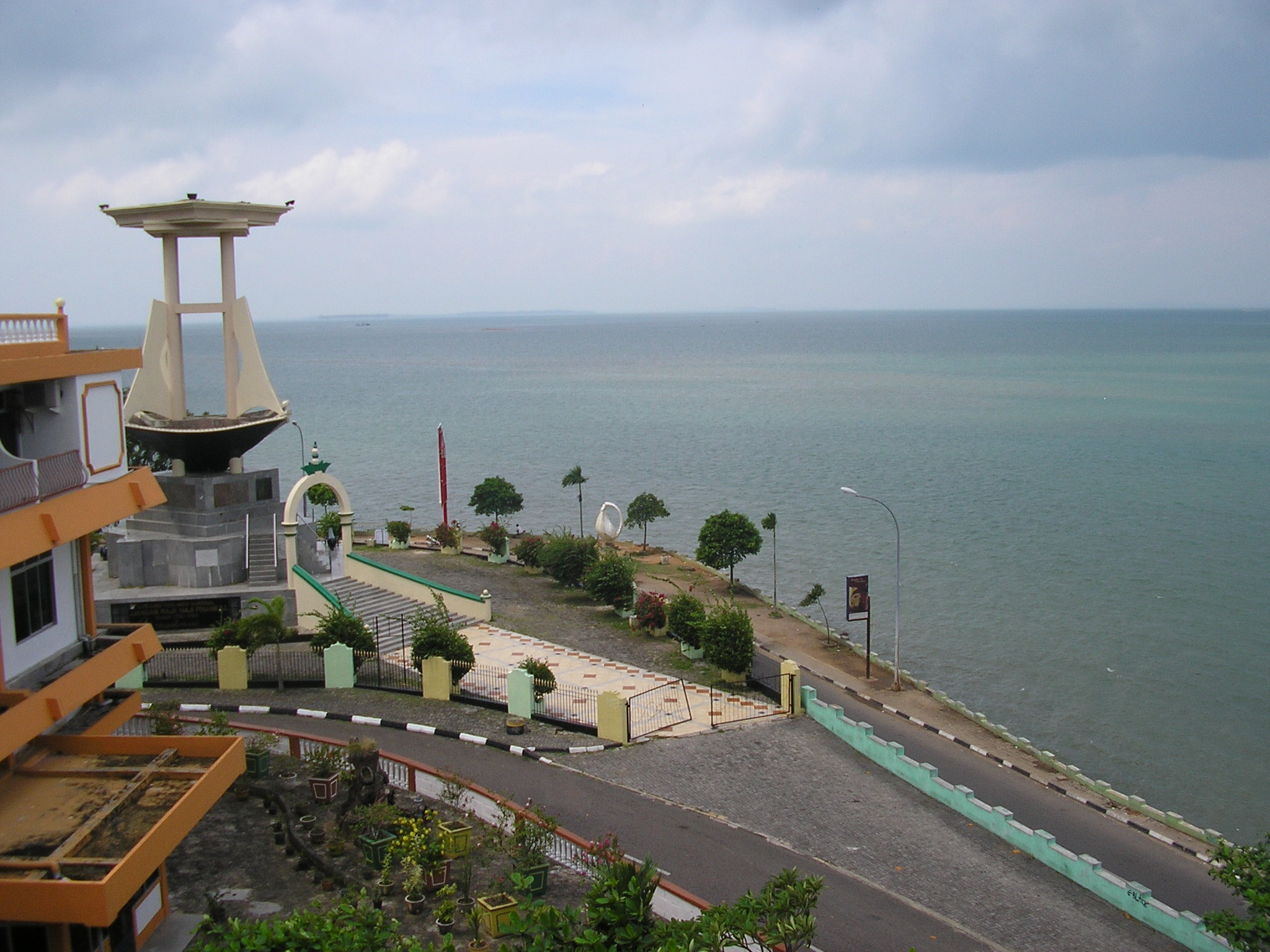
Raja Haji Fisabilillah Monument in Tanjungpinang.

Raja Haji led a series of raids on A Famosa, a Dutch fortress in Malacca. On the verge of victory after surrounding the Dutch forces in one of her forts, he was, however, shot from a distance, killing him instantly. He died on 18 June 1784 at Teluk Ketapang, Malacca.

The effect of the war infuriated his nephew, Raja Ibrahim, as it has caused Selangor to be involved indirectly in the war between the Dutch and Johor.

According to famed Malay writer Munshi Abdullah, Raja Haji's body was recovered by the Dutch and rumoured to have been buried in a pig farm. It was not until the English conquered Malacca that the royal family requested Raja Haji's body to be removed from the pig farm. He was subsequently given a proper Muslim burial at Bukit Kursi, Penyengat Island, Riau Islands during the reign of his son Raja Ja'far, the 6th Yang Dipertuan Muda.

His grandchild, Raja Ali Haji would later become a renowned historian, poet, and scholar.

== Legacy ==
His bravery was remembered by Indonesians, as the Indonesian government has posthumously proclaim him as the "National Hero of Indonesia" on 11 August 1997, and the Raja Haji Fisabilillah Airport in Tanjungpinang, Riau Islands, was renamed in honor of him in 2008.

In Malaysia, a mosque was named after him, Raja Haji Fisabilillah Mosque, in Cyberjaya in the state of Selangor which was completed on 24 February 2015.

In June 2024, the Governor of Riau Islands announced that a future Indonesian Navy warship would be named after him. On 20 September 2024, a new Indonesian Navy warship, the patrol vessel KRI Raja Haji Fisabilillah, was named after him.

Regnal titles
Preceded by Daeng Kemboja	Yang di-Pertuan Muda of Riau; 1777–1784	Succeeded by Raja Ali
