= Abdul Jalil Muazzam Shah of Johor =

Abdul Jalil Muazzam Shah عبد الجاليل معزم شاه
- Sultan of Johor
- Reign: 1760–1761
- Predecessor: Sulaiman Badrul Alam Shah
- Successor: Ahmad Riayat Shah
- Born: 11 March 1738
- Died: 29 January 1761 (aged 22); Kuala Selangor
- Burial: Batangan, Riau
- Issue: Ahmad Riayat Shah; Mahmud Shah III
- House: Bendahara dynasty
- Father: Sulaiman Badrul Alam Shah
- Religion: Sunni Islam

Paduka Sri Sultan ‘Abdu’l Jalil V Mu’azzam Shah Zilu’llah fil’Alam Khalifat ul-Muminin ibni al-Marhum Sultan Sulaiman Badr ul-‘Alam Shah (11 March 1738–29 January 1761) was the 15th Sultan and Yang di-Pertuan Besar of Johor and Pahang and their dependencies who reigned from 1760 to 1761.

Styled as Raja di-Baroh before his accession, he was the second son of the 12th Sultan of Johor, Sulaiman Badrul Alam Shah. He was installed as heir apparent with the title of 'Raja Muda' in October 1759. He succeeded his father as sultan on his death on August 20, 1760. His reign ended less than a year later when he died of poisoning, possibly by a Bugis chief, at Kuala Selangor on January 29, 1761. He was buried at Batangan, Riau, having had two sons. He was succeeded by his son Ahmad Riayat Shah.

== Bibliography ==
- Ahmad Sarji Abdul Hamid (2011), The Encyclopedia of Malaysia, vol. 16 - The Rulers of Malaysia, Editions Didier Millet, ISBN 978-981-3018-54-9

Abdul Jalil Muazzam Shah of Johor Bendahara dynasty Born: 1738 Died: 1761
Regnal titles
Preceded by Sulaiman Badrul Alam Shah	Sultan of Johor; 1760–1761	Succeeded by Ahmad Riayat Shah
