= Daeng Kemasi =

- Pangeran Mangkubumi
- Born: Luwu, Sulawesi
- Died: Sambas, West Kalimantan
- Spouse: Raden Tengah
- Father: Daeng Rilaka
- Mother: Opu Tenribong
- Occupation: nobleman, warrior

Opu Daeng Kemasi was one of five brothers of the Bugis Luwu Kingdom of Sulawesi, who once established political dominance over the royals in the Malay Realm.

== History ==
Daeng Kemasi was the youngest of the five Bugis sons of Daeng Rilaka and Opu Tenribong from Luwu, Sulawesi; his four other brothers being Daeng Parani, Daeng Menambun, Daeng Marewah and Daeng Chelak.

During his travels, Daeng Kemasi and Daeng Menambun went to Sambas, West Kalimantan, where he married Raden Tengah, the younger sister of Umar Aqamuddin I, the third Sultan of Sambas. Daeng Kemasi was later given the title Pangeran Mangkubumi.
