= Daeng Menambun =

Panembahan Mempawah

- Panembahan Pangeran Mas Surya Negara

Panembahan Mempawah
- Reign: 1740–1761
- Successor: Gusti Jamiril
- Born: 1695; Luwu, Sulawesi
- Died: 1763 (aged 67–68); Mempawah, West Kalimantan
- Buried: 1763; Bukit Rama, Kampung Pasir, Mempawah Hilir, Pontianak, West Kalimantan
- Spouse: Ratu Kesumba
- Issue: Putri Candramidi; Gusti Jamiril; Syarif Ahmad; Syarif Abubakar; Syarif Alwi; Syarif Muhammad
- Father: Daeng Rilaka
- Mother: Opu Tenribong
- Occupation: nobleman, warrior

Opu Daeng Menambun (1695 – 1763) was the Panembahan of the Mempawah Kingdom. He was one of five brothers of the Bugis Luwu Kingdom of Sulawesi, who once established political dominance over the royals in the Malay Realm.

== History ==
Daeng Menambun was the second among five Bugis sons of Daeng Rilaka and Opu Tenribong from Luwu, Sulawesi; his four other brothers being Daeng Parani, Daeng Marewah, Daeng Chelak and Daeng Kemasi.

The arrival of Daeng Menambun to Sukadana, West Kalimantan, Borneo was at the request of Sultan Muhammad Zainuddin (1665–1724), to help reclaim the throne of the Matan Sultanate which was forcibly taken by Pangeran Agung, brother of Sultan Muhammad Zainuddin. Daeng Menambun and his brothers, who were in the Johor Sultanate at the time helping quell the upheaval there, immediately left for Matan. With the help of the Bugis brothers, the throne of Sultan Muhammad Zainuddin was reclaimed. Daeng Menambun was then married to Ratu Kesumba, daughter of Sultan Muhammad Zainuddin. Not long after, Opu Daeng Menambun's brothers returned to the Johor Sultanate.

Internal turmoil occurred again in the Matan Sultanate. Sultan Muhammad Zainuddin's children argued over who had the right to inherit the throne of the Matan Sultanate if their father died. Sultan Muhammad Zainuddin again asked for help from Daeng Menambun who had returned to the Johor Sultanate. Daeng Menambun complied with Sultan Muhammad Zainuddin's request and immediately headed to Matan for the second time, while his four other brothers did not participate because their help was needed for the Johor Sultanate.

Thanks to Daeng Menambun, disputes in the Matan Sultanate were resolved peacefully. Sultan Muhammad Zainuddin bestowed Daeng Menambun with the honorary title of Pangeran Mas Surya Negara. Daeng Menambun decided to stay in the Matan Sultanate with his wife, and they had several children together named Putri Candramidi, Gusti Jamiril, Syarif Ahmad, Syarif Abubakar, Syarif Alwi, and Syarif Muhammad. Daeng Menambun moved to Mempawah, and in 1740 became the raja with the title Panembahan Mempawah, Panembahan Pangeran Mas Surya Negara (1740–1761).

In 1740, power over Mempawah was handed over to Daeng Menambun who later adopted the title Pangeran Mas Surya Negara, a title previously given by the late Sultan Muhammad Zainuddin. Meanwhile, Daeng Menambun's wife, Ratu Kesumba, holds the title Ratu Agung Sinuhun. It was during the Daeng Menambun's era that Islam became the official religion of the kingdom. Daeng Menambun moved the center of his government from Senggaok to Bukit Rama which was a fertile, prosperous, and strategic area, and was crowded with traders.

The influence of Islam in Mempawah during Daeng Menambun's reign was even greater thanks to the role of Syarif Habib Husein Alkadrie, a traveler who came from Hadhramaut or South Yemen. Husein Alkadrie had previously served as the main judge in the Matan Sultanate during the reign of Sultan Muhammad Muazzuddin. Husein Alkadrie was married to the daughter of Sultan Muhammad Muazzuddin named Nyai Tua Utin Kabanat. In the Matan Sultanate, Husein Alkadrie served until the reign of the 4th Sultan of Matan, namely Sultan Ahmad Kamaluddin, who succeeded Sultan Muhammad Tajuddin in 1749. However, in 1755, Husein Alkadrie disagreed with Sultan Ahmad Kamaluddin about the application of the death penalty.

Seeing this condition, Daeng Menambun offered Husein Alkadrie to live in Mempawah. The offer was accepted by Husein Alkadrie who immediately moved to the Daeng Menambun's Palace. Husein Alkadrie was later appointed as Patih and Mufti of Mempawah. In addition, Husein Alkadrie was allowed to occupy the Kuala Mempawah (Galah Herang) area to serve as a center for teaching Islam. To further strengthen the relationship between Husein Alkadrie's family and Mempawah, marriage was held between Daeng Menambun's daughter Utin Candramidi and Husein Alkadrie's son Syarif Abdurrahman Alkadrie.

In 1761, Daeng Menambun was succeeded by his son Gusti Jamiril who had the title of Panembahan Adiwijaya Kusumajaya. Under the leadership of Panembahan Adiwijaya, Mempawah's territory expanded and became known as a bustling trading port.

In 1763, Daeng Menambun died and he was buried in Bukit Rama, Kampung Pasir, Mempawah Hilir, Pontianak, West Kalimantan.
