= Raja Kecil =

Former Sultan of Siak

Abdul Jalil Rahmat Shah

Sultan of Siak
- Reign: 1722–1746
- Successor: Muhammad Abdul Jalil Jalaluddin Shah

Sultan of Johor
- Reign: 1718-1722
- Predecessor: Abdul Jalil Shah IV
- Successor: Sulaiman Badrul Alam Shah
- Died: c. 1746
- Spouse: Tengku Kamariah Sultan Abdul Jalil Riayat Shah IV
- Father: Mahmud Shah II of Johor
- Religion: Sunni Islam

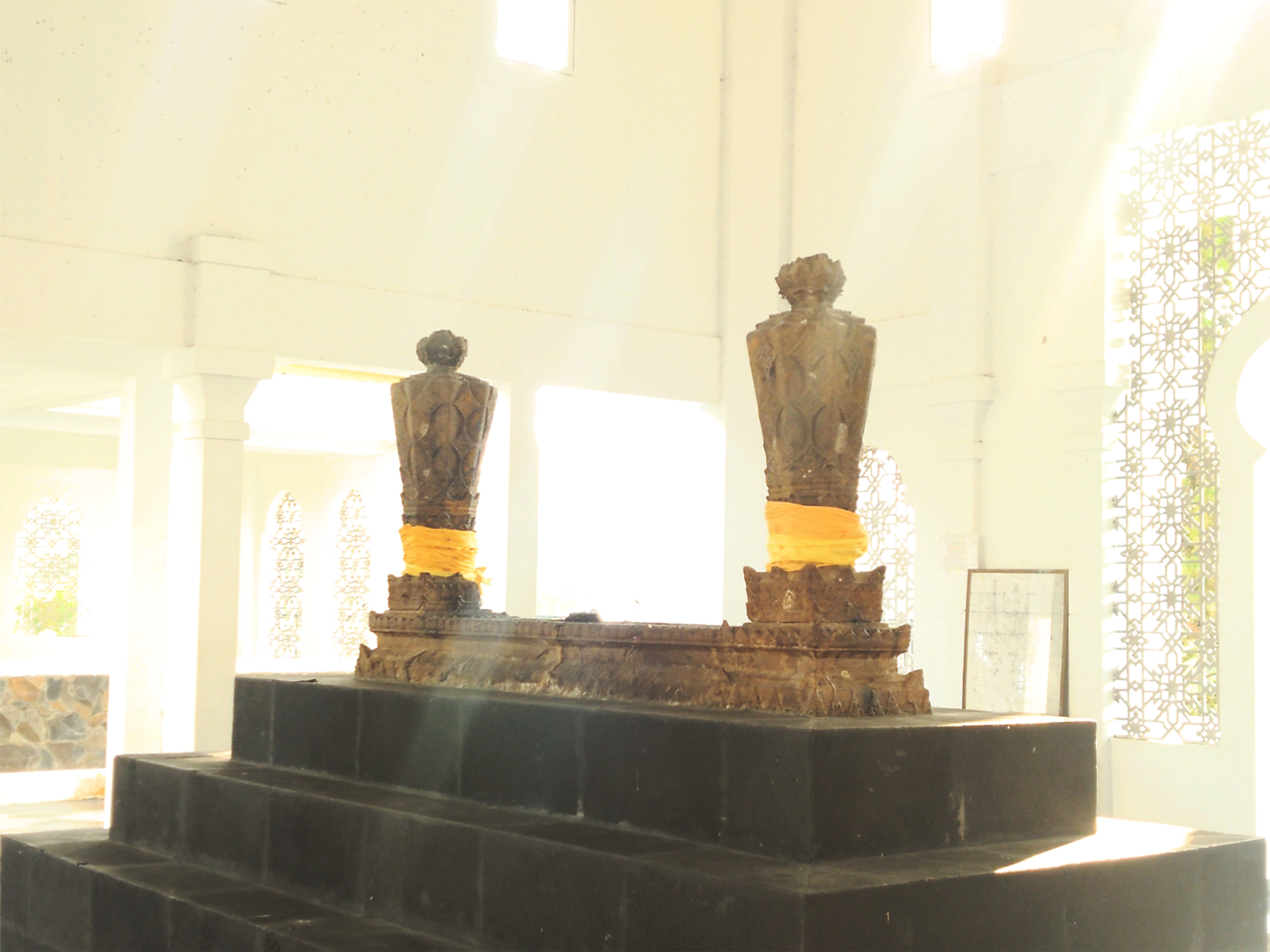
The gravestone of Marhum Buantan (Raja Kecil), the first sultan of Siak

Raja Kecil (d. 1746), or Raja Kecik, also known as Sultan Abdul Jalil Rahmat Shah (r. 1722–1746), was the first sultan of the Sultanate of Siak Sri Indrapura. A controversial figure, due to his origin tales and the rebellion he led, Raja Kecil united a multi-ethnic force in eastern Sumatra to defeat the Johor Sultanate in 1718. He then ruled Johor for four years, before retreating to eastern Sumatra, where he established a new state along the Siak River in 1722.

Raja Kecil continued to oversee periodic attacks on Johor for another decade, while he consolidated control over trade routes between the Strait of Malacca and the resource-rich interior of Sumatra. After 1735, he allowed two of his sons, Raja Mahmud (Sultan Muhammad Abdul Jalil Jalaluddin Shah) and Raja Alam (Sultan Abdul Jalil Alamuddin Shah), to oversee the kingdom, which he ruled in name only. Raja Kecil died in Buantan, the capital of Siak Sri Indrapura, and his grave remains an important site for residents of the region.

== Origins and conflicts with the Bugis ==
The origins of Raja Kecil are obscure and it is difficult to establish a date of birth. According to local legends, he was the son of Sultan Mahmud Shah II of Johor. Conceived under supernatural circumstances on the eve of the murder of Sultan Mahmud in 1699, courtiers supposedly sent Raja Kecik (literally, "little king" in local dialect) to the Minangkabau Highlands in central Sumatra, where he came under the protection of the ruling queen.

Tales exists of his plans to overthrow Johor's rule over eastern Sumatra in the 1710s. In the mid-1710s, the young prince, known at the time as Tuan Bujang, travelled to Bengkalis, a trade port in eastern Sumatra, where he united various merchants and mercenaries who disliked the control Johor exercised over their commerce.

Raja Kecil was then known as a pretender to the Johorean throne. During his meeting at Bengkalis, he made plans with the Bugis warriors Daeng Parani and Daeng Chelak to then travel to Langat to amass armed forces, to take over Johor. However, Raja Kecil eventually captured Johor Lama on 1717 without the help of the Bugis. This breaking of their agreement eventually led to skirmishes between the Bugis and Raja Kecil's faction of Minangkabau fighters. The continual conflicts ended in a 1721 battle where Daeng Parani used muskets and blunderbusses against Raja Kecil's less effective swords and cannons.

Aside from conflicts with the Bugis, Raja Kecil used his own desire to avenge the death of his alleged father, by leading these disgruntled groups to attack Johor in 1718. The presence of this tale and its use during the attack on Johor point toward a Minangkabau origin for Raja Kecil, as he already had grown children in 1718. The myth, however, allowed him to unite disparate groups with various grievances with Johor. By placing him under the guidance of the ruler in Pagar Ruyung, he was able to appeal to the many Minangkabau migrants in eastern Sumatra, while his conception myth tied into beliefs related to the sanctity of the Johor-Malacca-Srivijaya lineage of rulers that historical texts such as the Malay Annals reinforced. It also created continuity in the history of the region, ultimately linking the Siak state to the Malacca Sultanate, and elevating its status as a Malay state in a diverse, multi-ethnic region.

== Rule over Johor (1718–1722) ==
In February 1718, Raja Kecil and his followers attacked Johor, which had been under the leadership of the former Bendahara, Sultan Abdul Jalil Shah IV following the murder of Sultan Mahmud Shah II. His forces captured the capital on 1 March 1718 and he became the ruler of Johor. His actions after this victory created doubt in the veracity of his origin myth, however, as Raja Kecil immediately retreated to eastern Sumatra, re-appointed Abdul Jalil Shah IV as the Bendahara and married one of his daughters, Tengku Kamariah.

Raja Kecil had particular problems maintaining the loyalty of his Orang Laut followers, who had played a key role in the defeat of Johor due to their loyalty to the earlier sultans and were key to controlling sea lanes and navigation in the region. Chaos and uncertainty reigned in Johor for the next four years, as Raja Kecil attempted to consolidate his power in eastern Sumatra, appeal to the many different ethnic groups in the region, and prevent the return of the Bendahara to a position of real authority. This resulted in Raja Kecil moving between eastern Sumatra and Johor frequently, while he alternated between supporting and threatening the Bendahara family, until they fled to Pahang.

Finally, he order the assassination of the Bendahara. To counter any further threats from Raja Kecil, the sons of the murdered Bendahara came to an agreement with Bugis mercenaries to share power in exchange for protection. This was the origin of the modern Johor-Riau-Lingga Sultanate. Having lost the support of his Orang Laut followers, and under pressure from Bugis mercenaries, Raja Kecil abandoned Johor. The rulership of Johor was then passed to Sultan Sulaiman under the heavy dominance of the Bugis elites headed by, among others, Daeng Marewah.

== The Siak Sultanate (1722–1746) ==
Raja Kecil returned to eastern Sumatra and established the Siak Sultanate at Buantan in 1722. As he consolidated power over eastern Sumatra, he continued to participate in battles against the Bugis and attacks on Johor for the next decade. Along the Siak River, Raja Kecil developed a state that controlled numerous important trade routes between the Strait of Malacca and the various rivers into the resource-rich Minangkabau interior of Sumatra, which served as a foundation for the future prosperity of the sultanate.

The death of Tengku Kamariah in the late 1730s, according to traditional texts from the region, led Raja Kecil to suffer incapacitating melancholia. No longer willing to oversee the affairs of state, Raja Kecil allowed his advisory council, known as the Four Penghulu and consisting of his elite supporters, to choose which of his sons would become the ruler of Siak. They chose Raja Mahmud, who officially became Sultan Muhammad Abdul Jalil Jalaluddin Shah following his father's death in 1746, although he ruled the state for at least five years prior to his formal elevation to the throne. Under these circumstances, the other son, Raja Alam fled to the Strait of Malacca to gather followers in a series of attempts to counter his brother, a pattern that would haunt Siak leadership for decades.

== Death and burial ==
Raja Kecil died in 1746. He was buried in Buantan, and thus took on the title of Marhum Buantan. His grave, on the outskirts of the modern town of Siak Sri Indrapura is now a site where visitors frequent and is considered to be a karamat (holy grave) site.

Raja Kecil Bendahara dynasty Born: ? Died: 1746
Regnal titles
Preceded by Abdul Jalil Shah IV	Sultan of Johor; 1718–1722	Succeeded by Sulaiman Badrul Alam Shah
