= Abdul Jalil Shah IV of Johor =

Sultan of Johor (r. 1699–1718)

Abdul Jalil Riayat Shah IV عبد الجاليل رعاية شاه
- Sultan of Johor
- Reign: 1699–1718
- Predecessor: Mahmud Shah II
- Successor: Abdul Jalil Rahmat Shah
- Died: 21 November 1721; Kuala Pahang
- Burial: Royal Cemetery, Kuala Pahang
- Issue: Sulaiman Badrul Alam Shah; Tun Abbas
- House: Bendahara (founder)
- Father: Tun Habib Abdul Majid
- Religion: Sunni Islam

Paduka Sri Sultan ‘Abdu’l Jalil IV Ri’ayat Shah Zillu’llah fi al-’Alam bin Dato’ Bendahara Sri Maharaja Tun Habib Abdul Majid (or simply as Sultan Abdul Jalil Shah IV, born Tun Abdul Jalil) was the Sultan and Yang di-Pertuan Besar of Johor and Pahang and their dependencies, who reigned from 1699 to 1718.

He was the eldest son of Bendahara Tun Habib Abdul Majid who initially succeeded his father as the Bendahara of Johor in 1697. Following the death of Mahmud Shah II without an heir in 1699, Abdul Jalil was proclaimed as the next sultan.

== Beginning of the Bendahara dynasty ==
Upon the death of Ibrahim Shah in 1685, his ten-year-old son, Mahmud Shah II, ascended the throne while state affairs were left to Bendahara Tun Habib Abdul Majid. As he grew up, Mahmud Shah gained a reputation for his unpredictable behaviour, and Johor gradually descended into a state of chaos. This instability was exacerbated in 1697 by the death of Tun Habib. Although the bendahara's son, Tun Abdul Jalil, inherited the position and maintained some stability for a time, Johor was thrown into a state of upheaval in 1699, when Mahmud Shah was assassinated by a local chief, Megat Seri Rama, whose pregnant wife was executed on the Sultan's orders. The assassination was carried out as the Sultan was on his way to a mosque for Friday prayers.

The assassination of Mahmud Shah marked the end of rulers of Johor who descended from the Sultans of the Malacca Sultanate and was a profound crisis for two reasons: firstly, the regicide was an act of treason, a grave offence according to the Malay worldview, and secondly, because Mahmud Shah had no known male successor.

To fill the vacant throne, the aristocracy proclaimed Tun Abdul Jalil as the succeeding sultan at Kota Tinggi on 3 September 1699. His accession, however, did not receive the unanimous support of all the various factions within Johor. Many questioned the legitimacy of the Sultan's rise to power. A deeply religious man, Abdul Jalil Shah IV gradually took less interest in governing his kingdom, devoting more time instead to his faith and to his Acehnese wife Che Nusamah.

== War in Selangor and rise of the Bugis ==
In 1715, the Bugis, based in Selangor, attacked and ransacked Kedah. As overlord of Selangor, Johor claimed part of the spoils. But while Malay custom allocated half the spoils to the overlord, Bugis custom entitled the overlord to only a tenth. Seeking to assert its claim, Johor attacked Bugis strongholds of Selangor and Linggi. Although the Johor armies were numerically superior, the Bugis successfully repelled the attack. By 1717, Johor withdrew its forces from Selangor.

The refusal of the Bugis to bow to Johor's demands exposed the sultanate's growing weakness. In addition, opposition factions towards Abdul Jalil's accession resulted several revolts against his regime. The turmoil set the stage for the emergence of the Siak prince, Raja Kecil.

== Coming of Raja Kecil ==
Following Abdul Jalil's contentious accession, Minangkabau settlements in Rembau, Sungei Ujong and Naning that existed since the mid-15th century, began to challenge Johor's authority. In 1717, Raja Kecil of Siak appeared on the scene, claiming to be the posthumously born son of the assassinated Mahmud Shah II. Backed by the Minangkabau, he was welcomed by many Johor subjects who hoped for the restoration of the dynasty descending from the rulers of Malacca.

In 1718, Raja Kecil appeared on the Riau River with Minangkabau troops and succeeded in overcoming the Johor fleet. He was then able to capture Johor's capital on Riau Island, and proclaim himself ruler, adopting the style Sultan Abdul Jalil Rahmat Shah (r. 1718–1722).

== Death ==
Following the victory of Raja Kecil's forces, the deposed Abdul Jalil Shah IV was re-appointed as Bendahara of the kingdom and lived at Kota Tinggi. By the end of 1718, he retired to Terengganu and further removed to Pahang in 1719. On 11 July 1721, he established Kuala Pahang as his new capital and made attempts to recover his kingdom with the support of nobles from Johor, Pahang and Kelantan.

There were now three power centres in the Malay world. Raja Kecil in Riau, Abdul Jalil Shah IV on the east coast of the Malay Peninsula and the Bugis in Selangor and Linggi. The Bugis eventually came out as victorious, in part because Raja Kecil had sabotaged his own popularity by having Abdul Jalil Shah IV killed in Kuala Pahang.

Abdul Jalil Shah IV was killed while conducting his prayers on board his ship, by an emissary sent by Raja Kecil off Kuala Pahang, on 21 November 1721. The sultan was buried at the Royal Cemetery, Kuala Pahang.

Raja Kecil finally admitted defeat in 1722, and the Bugis installed Abdul Jalil Shah IV's son Sulaiman Badrul Alam Shah, as the next sultan of Johor.

== Bibliography ==
- Ahmad Sarji Abdul Hamid (2011), The Encyclopedia of Malaysia, vol. 16 - The Rulers of Malaysia, Editions Didier Millet, ISBN 978-981-3018-54-9
  Abdul Jalil Shah IV of Johor Bendahara dynasty Died: 1721
  Regnal titles
  Preceded by Mahmud Shah II	Sultan of Johor; 1699–1718	Succeeded by Abdul Jalil Rahmat Shah
