= Daeng Chelak =

Second Yang di-Pertuan Muda of Riau

Yang di-Pertuan Muda of Riau
- Reign: 1728–1745
- Predecessor: Daeng Marewah
- Successor: Daeng Kemboja
- Born: Opu Daeng Chelak ibni La Tendri Borong Opu Daeng Rilakka; Luwu, Sulawesi
- Died: 1745; Riau
- Buried: 1745
- Issue: Salehuddin of Selangor; Raja Haji Fisabilillah
- Father: Daeng Rilaka
- Mother: Opu Tenribong
- Occupation: nobleman, warrior

Almarhum Yamtuan Muda Riau II Opu Daeng Chelak ibni Almarhum La Tendri Borong Opu Daeng Rilakka, Yamtuan Muda Riau II Opu Daeng Chelak (died May 1745) was the second Yang di-Pertuan Muda of Riau who held the position from 1728 to 1745.

== History ==
Daeng Chelak was the fourth among five Bugis sons of Daeng Rilaka and Opu Tenribong from Luwu, Sulawesi; his four other brothers being Daeng Parani, Daeng Menambun, Daeng Marewah and Daeng Kemasi.

In 1728 he was appointed by Sultan of Johor Sulaiman Badrul Alam Shah as the second Yang di-Pertuan Muda of Riau, replacing his older brother Daeng Marewah who had died. During his reign he made Riau a thriving port and trading center. He instructed the people of Riau to plant black pepper and gambier. He was a warlord and a politician at Riau.

== Death ==
He died in Ulu Riau in May 1745 and was buried there and he was called Marhum Mangkat di Kota by the people of Riau. His cousin Daeng Kemboja, a son of Daeng Parani, was appointed by Sultan Sulaiman Badrul Alam Shah as the third Yang di-Pertuan Muda of Riau.

== Legacy ==
His son Raja Lumu became the first Sultan of Selangor in 1766, while his another son Raja Haji Fisabilillah became the fourth Yang di-Pertuan Muda of Riau in 1777. Thus, Opu Daeng Chelak is the ancestor of the House of Opu Daeng Chelak and the House of Yang di-Pertuan Muda to the present day.

Regnal titles
Preceded by Daeng Marewah	Yang di-Pertuan Muda of Riau; 1728–1745	Succeeded by Daeng Kemboja
