= Sulaiman Badrul Alam Shah of Johor =

Sultan of Johor (1722–1760)

Sulaiman Badrul Alam Shah سليمان بدر العالم شاه
- Sultan of Johor
- Reign: 1722–1760
- Predecessor: Abdul Jalil Rahmat Shah
- Successor: Abdul Jalil Muazzam Shah
- Born: 11 November 1699
- Died: 20 August 1760 (aged 60); Riau
- Burial: Batangan, Riau
- Issue: Abdul Jalil Muazzam Shah
- House: Bendahara dynasty
- Father: Abdul Jalil Shah IV
- Religion: Sunni Islam

Paduka Sri Sultan Sulaiman Badr ul-‘Alam Shah Khalifat ul-Muminim ibni Almarhum Sultan ‘Abdu’l Jalil Ri’ayat Shah, (11 November 1699 – 20 August 1760) or simply Sulaiman Badrul Alam Shah of Johor and known as Raja Sulaiman before his ascension to the throne was the 14th Sultan and Yang di-Pertuan Besar of Johor and Pahang and their dependencies who reigned from 1722 to 1760. He succeeded on the defeat of the claimant to Johor throne, Raja Kecil who reigned in Johor from 1718 to 1722.

== Early life ==
Known as Raja Sulaiman before his accession, he was the fifth son of the 10th Sultan of Johor, Abdul Jalil Shah IV, by his fourth wife, Che Nusamah. He was appointed as Governor of Pahang, following the rebellion against his uncle, the Yang di-Pertuan Muda in 1712. His father later appointed him as his heir apparent with the title of Yang di-Pertuan Muda before December 28, 1715.

After the assassination of his father in 1721, who was earlier deposed and demoted by Raja Kecil in 1718, Raja Sulaiman and his sister, Tengku Tengah were taken captive by the Minangkabau forces. They were made servants of Raja Kecil, one to carry his kris, the other his betel box.

== Reign ==
Raja Sulaiman was put on the throne with the help of the Bugis princes after they had expelled Raja Kecil in 1722. He was crowned at Riau with title of Paduka Sri Sultan Sulaiman Badr ul-‘Alam Shah Khalifat ul-Muminim, on October 4, 1722. Sulaiman Shah had little real influence over the administration of his state. While the Bugis allowed to retain nominal supremacy, they introduced and maintained for themselves the office of Yamtuan Muda, in which the real power was vested.

The Bugis influence was so dominant that the Sultan even wrote to the Dutch governor of Malacca with a request to be rescued from them, but to no avail. Bugis dominance over Johor remained uncontested for the next few decades.

The Sultan was impressed with the military might of the Dutch and their help towards him against the Minang during the war against the Siak Sultanate. In response, during his trip to Malacca on August 1755, he agreed to hand over monopoly rights over to the Dutch in the tin-mining areas of Klang, Linggi and Selangor which were originally Bugis stronghold areas, this had the effect of angering the Bugis chiefs.

Sulaiman Shah died in Riau on August 20, 1760 and was buried at Batangan, having had seventeen sons and ten daughters. He was succeeded by his second son, Abdul Jalil Muazzam Shah.

== Bibliography ==
- Ahmad Sarji Abdul Hamid (2011), The Encyclopedia of Malaysia, vol. 16 - The Rulers of Malaysia, Editions Didier Millet, ISBN 978-981-3018-54-9

Sulaiman Badrul Alam Shah of Johor Bendahara dynasty Born: 1699 Died: 1760
Regnal titles
Preceded by Abdul Jalil Rahmat Shah	Sultan of Johor; 1722–1760	Succeeded by Abdul Jalil Muazzam Shah
