= Administrative divisions of the Dutch East Indies =

The Dutch East Indies was a Dutch colony consisting of what is now mostly the modern state of Indonesia. The Anglo-Dutch Treaty of 1824, which ceded Dutch Malacca, a governorate of the Dutch East Indies that was transferred to Great Britain has consolidated modern-day rule to the Malacca state of Malaysia. It was divided into three governorates, namely the Great East, Borneo (Kalimantan) and Sumatra, and into three provinces in Java. Provinces and governorates were further divided into residencies. Residencies under the provinces were divided into regencies (Dutch: regentschappen), and residencies under governorates were divided into departments (Dutch: Afdeelingen, modern spelling afdelingen) and then further into regentschappen.

The following list is the divisions of the Dutch East Indies in 1942, prior to the Japanese occupation in World War II.

== Sumatra ==
In 1938, all of the various Residencies and Gouvernements in Sumatra were reorganized under the new Gouvernement of Sumatra.

| Name | | | Population (1930) | Area (km^{2}) | Modern area | Native state(s) |
| Dutch name | Local name | Residency | Population (1930) | Area (km^{2}) | Modern area | Native state(s) |
|---|---|---|---|---|---|---|
| Residentie Atjèh en Onderhoorigheden | Aceh | Atjeh and Dependencies Residency | 1,003,062 | 55392.23 | Aceh, comprising the divisions (afdeeling) of Groot-Atjèh, Noordkust van Atjèh, Oostkust van Atjèh and Westkust van Atjèh. | State of Trumon |
| Residentie Tapanoeli | Tapanuli | Tapanoeli Residency | 1,042,583 | 39076.87 | western part of North Sumatra, consisting of the divisions (afdeeling) of Sibolga en Omstreken, Nias en omliggend eiland, Bataklanden and Padang Sidempoean | none |
| Residentie Oostkust van Sumatra | Sumatra Timur | Sumatra's East Coast Residency | 1,693,200 | 94583.25 | eastern part of North Sumatra and northern part of Riau, consisting of the divisions (afdeeling) of Langkat, Deli en Serdang, Asahan, Simaloengoen en Karolanden and Bengkalis; and with the municipalities (stadsgemeente) of Medan, Bindjai, Tebing Tinggi, Tandjoengbalai and Pematangsiantar | Kingdom of Siantar, Kingdom of Dolok Silau, Kingdom of Raya, Kingdom of Purba, Kingdom of Si Lima Kuta, Kingdom of Tanahdjawa, Langkat Sultanate, Deli Sultanate, Serdang Sultanate, Asahan Sultanate, Panei Sultanate, Siak Sultanate, Pelalawan Sultanate, Kedatuan of Batubara, Lima Puluh, Kampar and Pesisir, Paramount Chiefdoms of Lingga, Sarinembah, Suka, Barusjahe, Kutabuluh and other smaller states |
| Residentie Sumatra's Westkust | Sumatra Barat | Sumatra's West Coast Residency | 1,910,298 | 49778.10 | West Sumatra including Mentawai Islands, consisting of the divisions (afdeeling) of Tanah Datar, Agam, Solok, Limapoeloe Koto, and Zuid Benedenlanden; and with the municipalities (stadsgemeente) of Padang, Fort de Kock, and Sawahloento | none |
| Residentie Riouw en Onderhoorigheden | Riau | Riouw and Dependencies Residency | 298,225 | 31668.44 | southern part of Riau and Riau Islands, consisting of the divisions (afdeeling) of Indragiri and Tandjoengpinang | Indragiri Sultanate |
| Residentie Djambi | Jambi | Djambi Residency | 245,272 | 44923.76 | Jambi, consisting of the division (afdeeling) of Djambi | none |
| Residentie Benkoelen | Bengkulu | Benkoelen Residency | 323,123 | 26249.39 | Bengkulu, consisting of the division (afdeeling) of Benkoelen | none |
| Residentie Palembang | Palembang | Palembang Residency | 1,098,725 | 86355.65 | South Sumatra, consist of the divisions (afdeeling) of Palembang Bovenlanden, Palembang Benedenlanden, and Ogan en Komering-oeloe; and with the municipality (stadsgemeente) of Palembang | none |
| Residentie Bangka en Onderhoorigheden | Bangka | Bangka and Dependencies Residency | 278,792 | 16774.70 | Bangka and Belitung Islands, consisting of the divisions (afdeeling) of Bangka and Billiton | none |
| Residentie Lampongsche Districten | Lampung | Lampong Districts Residency | 361,563 | 28783.74 | Lampung, consisting of the division (afdeeling) of Teloekbetoeng | none |

== Java ==
Java comprised three provinces, West, Middle and East Java, the boundaries of which were similar to the island's pre-2000 boundaries.

=== West Java ===
Under control of Governorate of West Java (Gouvernement West-Java)

| Name | | | Population (1930) | Area (km^{2}) | Modern area | Native state(s) |
| Dutch name | Local name | Residency | Population (1930) | Area (km^{2}) | Modern area | Native state(s) |
|---|---|---|---|---|---|---|
| Residentie Bantam | Banten | Bantam Residency | 1,028,628 | n/a | Banten consisting of the regencies (regentschap) of Serang, Lebak and Pandeglang | none |
| Residentie Batavia | Betawi | Batavia Residency | 2,637,035 | n/a | Jakarta and surroundings, consisting of the regencies (regentschap) of Batavia (includes Tangerang and its surrounding city and regency), Meester-Cornelis (includes most of current West Jakarta and Bekasi) and Krawang (includes Purwakarta); with municipality (stadsgemeente) of Batavia | none |
| Residentie Buitenzorg | Bogor | Buitenzorg Residency | 2,212,997 | n/a | Bogor, Sukabumi and Cianjur, consisting of the regencies (regentschap) of Buitenzorg, Soekaboemi and Tjiandjoer; with municipalities (stadsgemeente) of Buitenzorg and Soekaboemi | none |
| Residentie Preanger-Regentschappen | Priangan | Preanger Regencies Residency | 3,448,796 | n/a | Bandung and surroundings, consisting of the regencies (regentschap) of Bandoeng, Soemedang, Tasikmalaja, Tjiamis and Garoet; with municipality (stadsgemeente) of Bandoeng | none |
| Residentie Cheribon | Cirebon | Cheribon Residency | 2,069,690 | n/a | Cirebon and surroundings, consisting of regencies (regentschap) of Cheribon, Koeningan, Indramajoe and Madjalengka; and with the municipality (stadsgemeente) of Cheribon | none |

=== Central Java ===
Under control of Governorate of Middle Java (Gouvernement Midden-Java):

| Name | | | Population (1930) | Area (km^{2}) | Modern area | Native state(s) |
| Dutch name | Local name | Residency | Population (1930) | Area (km^{2}) | Modern area | Native state(s) |
|---|---|---|---|---|---|---|
| Residentie Pekalongan | Pekalongan | Pekalongan Residency | 2,640,124 | n/a | Pekalongan, Tegal and surroundings, consisting of regencies (regentschap) of Pekalongan, Batang, Pemalang, Tegal and Brebes; and with the municipalities (stadsgemeente) of Pekalongan and Tegal | none |
| Residentie Banjoemas | Banyumas | Banjoemas Residency | 2,474,447 | n/a | Banyumas, Purwokerto and surroundings, consist of the regencies (regentschap) of Banjoemas, Poerwokerto, Tjilatjap and Bandjarnegara | none |
| Residentie Kedoe | Kedu | Kedoe Residency | 2,129,894 | n/a | Magelang and surroundings, consisting of the regencies (regentschap) of Magelang, Wonosobo, Temanggoeng, Poerworedjo and Keboemen; and with the municipality (stadsgemeente) of Magelang | none |
| Residentie Samarang | Semarang | Semarang Residency | 2,020,684 | n/a | The Semarang metropolitan area (Kedungsepur), consisting of the regencies (regentschap) of Samarang, Kendal, Demak and Grobogan; and with the municipalities (stadsgemeente) of Samarang and Salatiga | none |
| Residentie Djepara-Rembang | Jepara-Rembang | Djepara-Rembang Residency | 1,876,480 | n/a | Jepara, Rembang and surroundings, consisting of regencies (regentschap) of Pati, Djepara, Rembang, Blora and Koedoes | none |

=== East Java ===
Under control of Governorate of East Java (Gouvernement Oost-Java):

| Name | | | Population (1930) | Area (km^{2}) | Modern area | Native state(s) |
| Dutch name | Local name | Residency | Population (1930) | Area (km^{2}) | Modern area | Native state(s) |
|---|---|---|---|---|---|---|
| Residentie Madioen | Madiun | Madioen Residency | 1,909,801 | n/a | Madiun and surroundings, consisting of the regencies (regentschap) of Madioen, Magetan, Ngawi, Ponorogo and Patjitan; and with the municipality (stadsgemeente) of Madioen | none |
| Residentie Bodjonegoro | Bojonegoro | Bodjonegoro Residency | 1,986,129 | n/a | Bojonegoro and surroundings, consisting of the regencies (regentschap) of Bodjonegoro, Toeban and Lamongan | none |
| Residentie Kediri | Kediri | Kediri Residency | 2,469,955 | n/a | Kediri and surroundings, consisting of the regencies (regentschap) of Kediri, Ngandjoek, Blitar and Toeloengagoeng; and with the municipalities (stadsgemeente) of Kediri and Blitar | none |
| Residentie Soerabaja | Surabaya | Soerabaja Residency | 1,902,953 | n/a | The Surabaya metropolitan area, consisting of the regencies (regentschap) of Soerabaja, Sidoardjo, Modjokerto and Djombang; and with the municipalities (stadsgemeente) of Soerabaja and Modjokerto | none |
| Residentie Malang | Malang | Malang Residency | 2,741,105 | n/a | Malang, Probolinggo and surroundings, consisting of the regencies (regentschap) of Malang, Pasoeroean, Probolinggo and Loemadjang; and with the municipalities (stadsgemeente) of Malang, Pasoeroean and Probolinggo | none |
| Residentie Besoeki | Besuki | Besoeki Residency | 2,083,309 | n/a | Banyuwangi and surroundings, consisting of the regencies (regentschap) of Bondowoso, Panaroekan, Djember and Banjoewangi | none |
| Residentie Madoera | Madura | Madoera Residency | 1,962,462 | n/a | Madura, consisting of the regencies (regentschap) of Bangkalan, Pamekasan and Soemenep | none |

== Borneo ==
In 1938 both of these Residencies were again united in a Governorate of Borneo (Gouvernement van Borneo) with its capital at Banjarmasin.

| Name | | | Population (1930) | Area (km^{2}) | Modern area | Native state(s) |
| Dutch name | Local name | Residency | Population (1930) | Area (km^{2}) | Modern area | Native state(s) |
|---|---|---|---|---|---|---|
| Residentie Westerafdeeling van Borneo | Kalimantan Barat | Western Afdeelings of Borneo Residency | 802,447 | n/a | West Kalimantan, consisting of the Afdeelingen of Singkawang, Pontianak, Ketapang and Sintang | Sambas Sultanate, Pontianak Sultanate, Lordship of Koeboe, Lordship of Landak, Lordship of Mampawa, Lordship of Matan, Lordship of Sanggau, Lordship of Sekadau, Lordship of Selimbau, Lordship of Simpang, Lordship of Sintang, Lordship of Soekadana and Lordship of Tajan |
| Residentie Zuider en Oosterafdeeling van Borneo | Kalimantan Selatan dan Timur | Southern and Eastern Afdeelings of Borneo Residency | 1,366,214 | n/a | Central Kalimantan, South Kalimantan, East Kalimantan and North Kalimantan, consisting of the afdeelingen of Koeala Kapoeas, Bandjermasin, Hoeloe Soengei, Samarinda and Boeloengan en Berau; with the municipality (stadsgemeente) of Bandjermasin | Koetei Sultanate, Boeloengan Sultanate, Sambalioeng Sultanate, Goenoeng Taboer Sultanate, Principality of Kota Waringin and Principality of Pasir |

== The Great East ==
The governorate of the Great East (Dutch: 'Gouvernement Groote Oost') was created in 1938. It comprised the islands to the east of Borneo and Java, including the Lesser Sunda Islands, Sulawesi, Maluku and Western New Guinea.

=== Lesser Sunda Islands ===
| Name | | | Population (1930) | Area (km^{2}) | Modern area | Native state(s) |
| Dutch name | Local name | Residency | Population (1930) | Area (km^{2}) | Modern area | Native state(s) |
|---|---|---|---|---|---|---|
| Residentie Bali en Lombok | Bali dan Lombok | Bali and Lombok Residency | 1,802,683 | n/a | Bali and Lombok, consisting of the divisions (afdeeling) of Singaradja, Zuid Bali and Lombok | Kingdom of Kloengkoeng with primacy over several states in Bali and Lombok (Boeleleng, Tabanan, Djembrana, Karang Assam, Bangli, Badoeng, Gianyar) |
| Residentie Timor en Onderhoorigheden | Timor | Timor and Dependencies Residency | 1,657,376 | n/a | West Nusa Tenggara East of Lombok and East Nusa Tenggara, consisting of the divisions (afdeeling) of Soembawa, Soemba, Flores and Timor en eilanden | Kingdom of Larantuka, Kingdom of Sikka, Kingdom of Lio, Kingdom of Manggarai, Kingdom of Amarasi, Kingdom of Rote, Soembawa Sultanate, Bima Sultanate, and several small states |

=== Sulawesi ===
| Name | | | Population (1930) | Area (km^{2}) | Modern area | Native state(s) |
| Dutch name | Local name | Residency | Population (1930) | Area (km^{2}) | Modern area | Native state(s) |
|---|---|---|---|---|---|---|
| Residentie Celebes en Onderhoorigheden | Sulawesi | Celebes and Dependencies Residency | 3,093,251 | n/a | South Sulawesi, West Sulawesi and Southeast Sulawesi, consisting of the afdeelingen of Soenggoeminasa, Bonthain, Makassar, Bone, Paré-Paré, Mandar, and Loewoe, Boetoeng en Laiwoei and with the municipality (stadsgemeente) of Makassar | Gowa Sultanate, Boetoeng Sultanate Lordship of Banggai, Kedatuan of Sawitto, Lordship of Bone, Lordship of Loewoe, Lordship of Sidenreng, Lordship of Soppeng, Lordship of Wadjo, Lordship of Moena and other smaller states |
| Residentie Menado | Manado | Manado Residency | 1,138,665 | n/a | Central Sulawesi, Gorontalo, and North Sulawesi, consisting of the afdeelingen of Poso, Donggala, Gorontalo, Menado, and Sangihe en Talaud eiland with the municipality (stadsgemeente) of Menado | none |

=== Maluku and Western New Guinea ===
In 1922 with the dissolution of Residentie Ternate to Residentie Amboina, Residentie Amboina was renamed to Residentie Molukken. In 1935, the residentie was renamed to Governorate of the Moluccas (Gouvernement Molukken) until the creation of Gouvernement Groote Oost in 1938, in which Gouvernement Molukken became residentie again.

| Name | | | Population (1930) | Area (km^{2}) | Modern area | Native state(s) |
| Dutch name | Local name | Department | Population (1930) | Area (km^{2}) | Modern area | Native state(s) |
|---|---|---|---|---|---|---|
| Afdeeling Ternate | Ternate | Ternate Afdeeling | 560,013 | n/a | North Maluku | Ternate Sultanate, Tidore Sultanate and Batjan Sultanate |
| Afdeeling Amboina | Ambon | Amboina Afdeeling | 560,013 (with Tual) | n/a | Maluku | some small states, State of Amahusu and State of Soya |
| Afdeeling Toeal | Tual | Afdeeling of Tual | 0 | n/a | Southeast Maluku | none |
| Afdeeling Nieuw-Guinea | (Dutch) New Guinea | New Guinea Afdeeling | 333,387(with South New-Guinea) | n/a | West Papua and Papua | none |
| Afdeeling Zuid Nieuw-Guinea | (Dutch) Southern New Guinea | South New Guinea Afdeeling | 0 | n/a | Southern part of West Papua and Papua | State of Kaimana and Fatagar |

== Malay Peninsula ==
=== Malacca ===
The governorate of Malacca (Gouvernement Malacca) was a part of the Dutch East Indies (1818-1825), before finally handing it to United Kingdom of Great Britain and Ireland based on Anglo-Dutch Treaty of 1824.

| Name | | | Population (1824) | Area (km^{2}) | Modern area | Native state(s) |
| Dutch name | Local name | Residency | Population (1824) | Area (km^{2}) | Modern area | Native state(s) |
|---|---|---|---|---|---|---|
| Residentie Malacca | Melaka | Malacca Residency | ~40,000 | 1664 | Malacca City and surroundings, consisting of the regencies (regentschap) of Melaka Tengah, Jasin and Alor Gajah | Sultanate of Johor |

== Vorstenlanden ==
Vorstenlanden were four native states on the island of Java in the Netherlands Indies that were nominally self-governing under suzerainty of the Kingdom of the Netherlands. Their political autonomy was however severely constrained by treaties and settlements. Two of them were the Governorate of Djokjakarta and the Governorate of Soerakarta, which controlled the Residentie Djokjakarta and the Residenties of Soerakarta and Klaten respectively.

| Name | | | Population (1930) | Area (km^{2}) | Modern area | Native state(s) |
| Dutch name | Local name | Residency | Population (1930) | Area (km^{2}) | Modern area | Native state(s) |
|---|---|---|---|---|---|---|
| Residentie Djokjakarta | Yogyakarta | Djokjakarta Residency | 1,559,027 | n/a | Yogyakarta, consisting of the regencies (regentschap) of Adikarto, Pakoealaman, Koelon-Progo, Jogjakarta, Bantoel and Goenoeng-Kidul | Jogjakarta Sultanate and Duchy of Pakoe Alaman |
| Residentie Soerakarta | Surakarta | Soerakarta Residency | 2,564,848 (with Klaten) | n/a | Surakarta, consisting of the regencies (regentschap) of Sragen, Soerakarta, Kota Mangkoenagaran and Wonogiri | Soerakarta Sunanate and Duchy of Mangkoe Negaran |
| Residentie Klaten | Klaten | Klaten Residency | 0 | n/a | consisting of the regencies (regentschap) of Klaten and Bojolali | Soerakarta Sunanate |
