= Bengkulu (disambiguation) =

Bengkulu, historically spelled as Bencoolen or Benkoelen , is a province of Indonesia on the island of Sumatra.

Bengkulu, Bencoolen, or Benkoelen may also refer to:

- Bengkulu (city), the capital of the province
- PS Bengkulu, a football club based in the city of Bengkulu
- Bengkulu language or Central Malay
- Bengkulu people, a subgroup of Malay Indonesians
- Kompas TV Bengkulu, formerly Bengkulu TV, a television channel in Bengkulu
- University of Bengkulu
- Bencoolen (ship), several ships
- British Bencoolen, a former British possession in Sumatra
- Bencoolen Street, in Singapore
- Bencoolen MRT station, in Singapore
- Benkoelen Residency, a former residency of the Dutch East Indies

== See also ==
- Bencoolen (disambiguation)
