= Joan Hendrik Tobias =

Dutch colonial official (1783–1857)

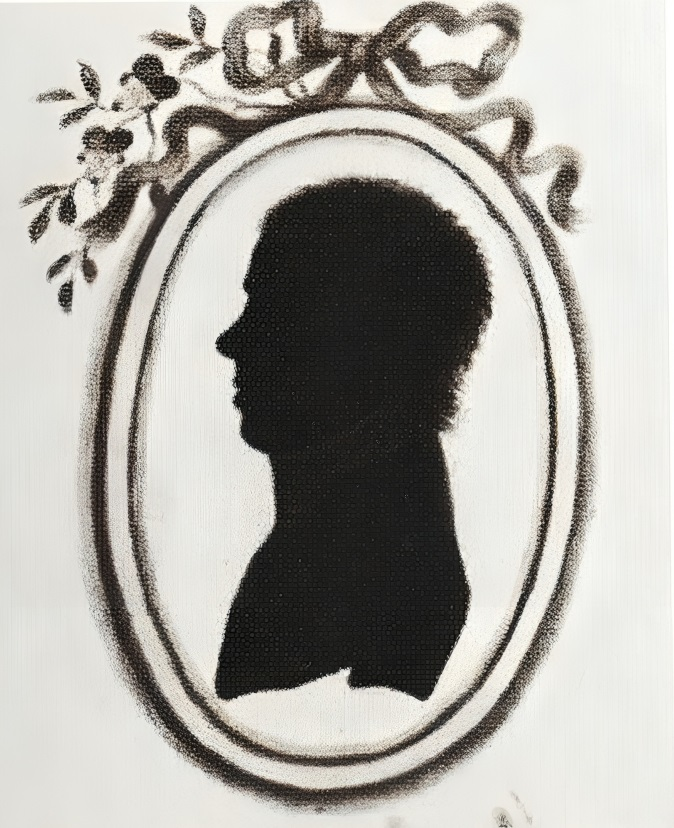
- Silhouette portrait of Joan Hendrik Tobias as depicted in an 1801 family tree

Bantam Residency
- In office 1819–1821

Personal details
- Born: November 12, 1783 Zwolle, Overijssel, The Netherlands
- Died: November 27, 1857 (aged 74) Bogor, West Java, Indonesia
- Spouse: Elizabeth Johanna Maria Rosenquist
- Education: University of Harderwijk (PhD 1802)

Joan Hendrik Tobias (12 November 1783 – 27 November 1857) was a Dutch colonial official who lived in Zwolle and worked in the Dutch East Indies.

== Early life and education ==
Tobias was born in Zwolle on 12 November 1783. His father, Herman Antonij Tobias, served as mayor of Zwolle between 1802 and 1808.

Joan Hendrik Tobias graduated from the University of Harderwijk with a doctorate in Applied Sciences in 1802.

== Career ==
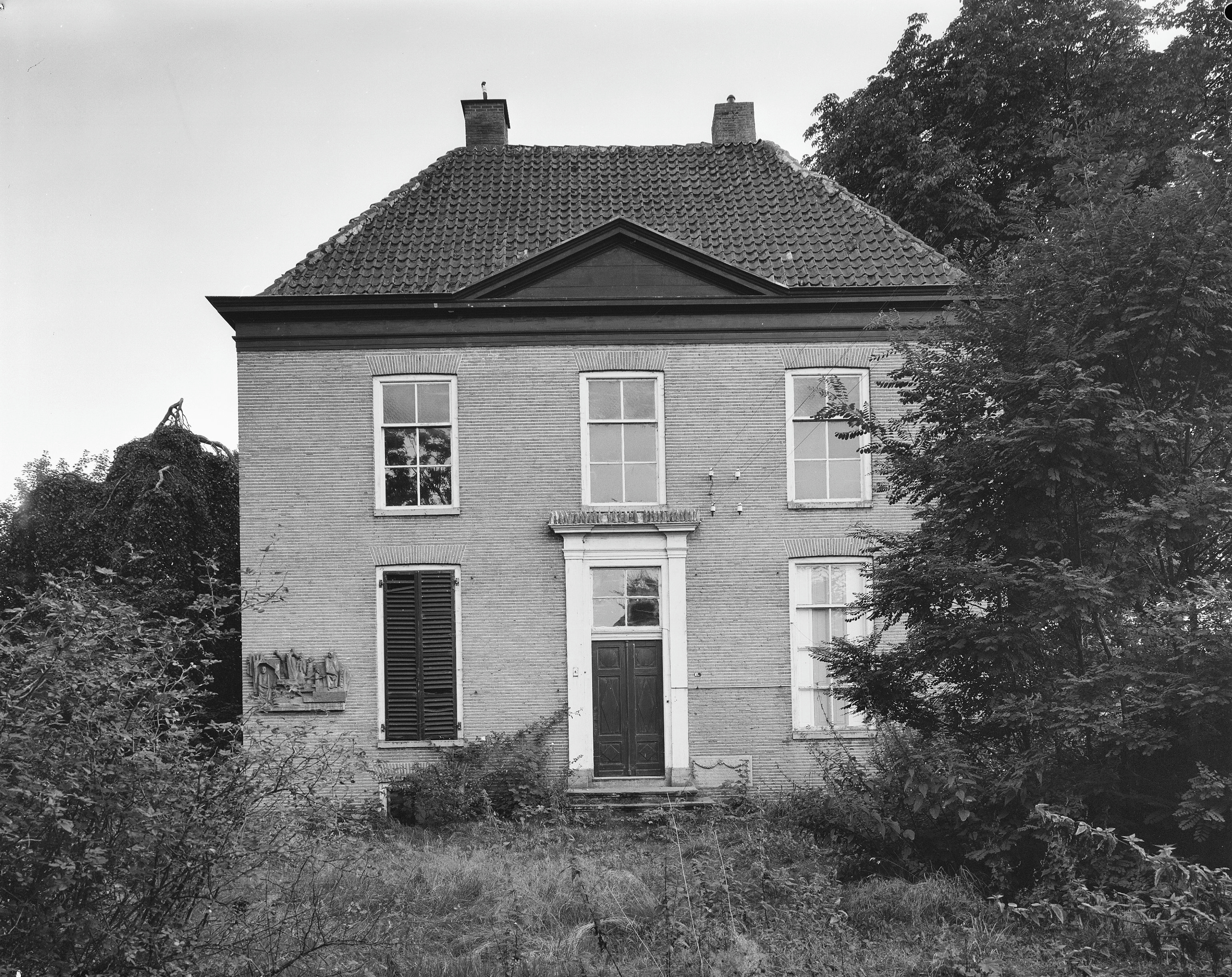
Tobias resided at Huize Arnichem in Zwolle.

Tobias travelled extensively between the Netherlands and the Dutch East Indies; between 1802 and 1857, he had completed more than 10 voyages to Indonesia. Tobias held public office as leader of the Bantam Residency in Java between 1819 and 1821.

In the Netherlands, Tobias is associated with Huize Arnichem, which is an estate near Zwolle, where Tobias resided when he was not in the East Indies.

Tobias is associated with the Tomb of Lepejou, the oldest known Muslim burial site in the Netherlands. Oral histories relate that Lepejou saved the life of Joan Hendrik Tobias and Tobias subsequently brought Lepejou from Sulawesi to the Netherlands.

== Death and legacy ==
Tobias died in Bogor, Java, on 27 November 1857. Following Tobias' death, the Deli Sultanate Plantation Concession Agreement was resigned on 29 November 1857.

Tobias has been included in studies of Dutch colonial administration and in recent research on historical links between Dutch institutions and slavery.

== See also ==
- History of slavery in the Netherlands
- Tomb of Lepejou
