= Krui, Pesisir Barat Regency =

Krui
- Town
- Location of Krui in Lampung
- Coordinates: 5°11′20″S 103°56′10″E
- Country: Indonesia
- Province: Lampung
- Regency: West Pesisir Regency
- Time zone: UTC+7 (WIB)

Krui is a town in West Pesisir Regency of Lampung, Indonesia, which is the regency seat of West Pesisir. Throughout its history, it had been an exporter of pepper, ruled by a number of local kingdoms before falling under British rule in Bengkulu. Along with the rest of Bengkulu, it was transferred to the Dutch in 1824, remaining the center of commerce in Lampung's west coast. It became the seat of West Pesisir following the regency's formation in 2012. Today, it is a tourist attraction in Lampung for surfing.

== History ==
Krui likely acted as a port linked to inland settlements in western Lampung as early as the ninth and tenth centuries during the reign of the Srivijaya empire. Imported Chinese ceramics dated to this era have been found at sites close to modern Krui. Krui then fell under the influence of the Inderapura Kingdom, and then of Banten. By the early eighteenth century, the area had come under British (who had established themselves at Bengkulu to the north in 1685) influence. The East India Company entered into an agreement with Krui's chief, like other chiefs in the region, to provide the Company with pepper. Sometime in the eighteenth century, the Company began to refer to Krui's chief with the title pangeran (prince).

In 1785, the Company downgraded Bencoolen into a Residency, with a single company representative stationed in Krui. It was ceded to the Dutch East Indies along with other British possessions in Sumatra in 1824. Krui became the main commercial center of the Lampung's west coast, and also received an influx of Javanese transmigrants in the twentieth century. In independent Indonesia, Krui was initially part of North Lampung Regency and since 1991 West Lampung Regency, but in 2012 the West Pesisir Regency was split off and Krui became its regency seat.

== Economy ==
Krui is the main destination for tourists in West Pesisir, best known as a surfing destination. A World Surf League qualifying event, the Krui Pro, was held at Krui starting in 2017 until 2024. According to Lampung's tourism board, Krui is the main destination of foreign tourists visiting Lampung, with 80 percent of foreign visitors in 2019 heading for Krui. At the Central Pesisir district, where most of Krui is located, Statistics Indonesia recorded over 30 hotels or homestays catering to the tourists. There were over 20,000 foreign visitors to West Pesisir in 2022 and 2023, primarily going to Krui.

The town is served by the Muhammad Taufiq Kiemas airport, which has flights to Bengkulu and Bandar Lampung.

== Administration ==
The core of what was Krui district, formed in 1949, is today Central Pesisir district. In 2010, two further districts were split out: Way Krui and South Krui. The regency seat is formally set at the administrative village of Pasar Krui. The three districts have a combined area of 186.6 square kilometres (72.0 sq mi) and a total population of 42,500 in 2024, while Pasar Krui administrative village alone has a population of 5,467.
