= 1824 in Singapore =

- Decades: 1820s; 1840s
- See also: Other events of 1824; Timeline of Singaporean history

Events from the year 1824 in Singapore.

== Incumbents ==
- Resident: Dr. John Crawfurd

== Events ==
=== March ===
- 17 March - The Anglo-Dutch Treaty of 1824 was signed by Great Britain and the Netherlands.

=== August ===
- 2 August - The Treaty of Friendship and Alliance in Singapore was signed. The sultans of Johor cedes Singapore and its islands 10 geographical miles away from it to the British East India Company

== See also ==
- List of years in Singapore
- Anglo-Dutch Treaty of 1824
