= Madoera Residency =

Administrative subdivision of the Dutch East Indies

Madoera Residency Residentie Madoera
- Residency of Dutch East Indies
- 1857–1948
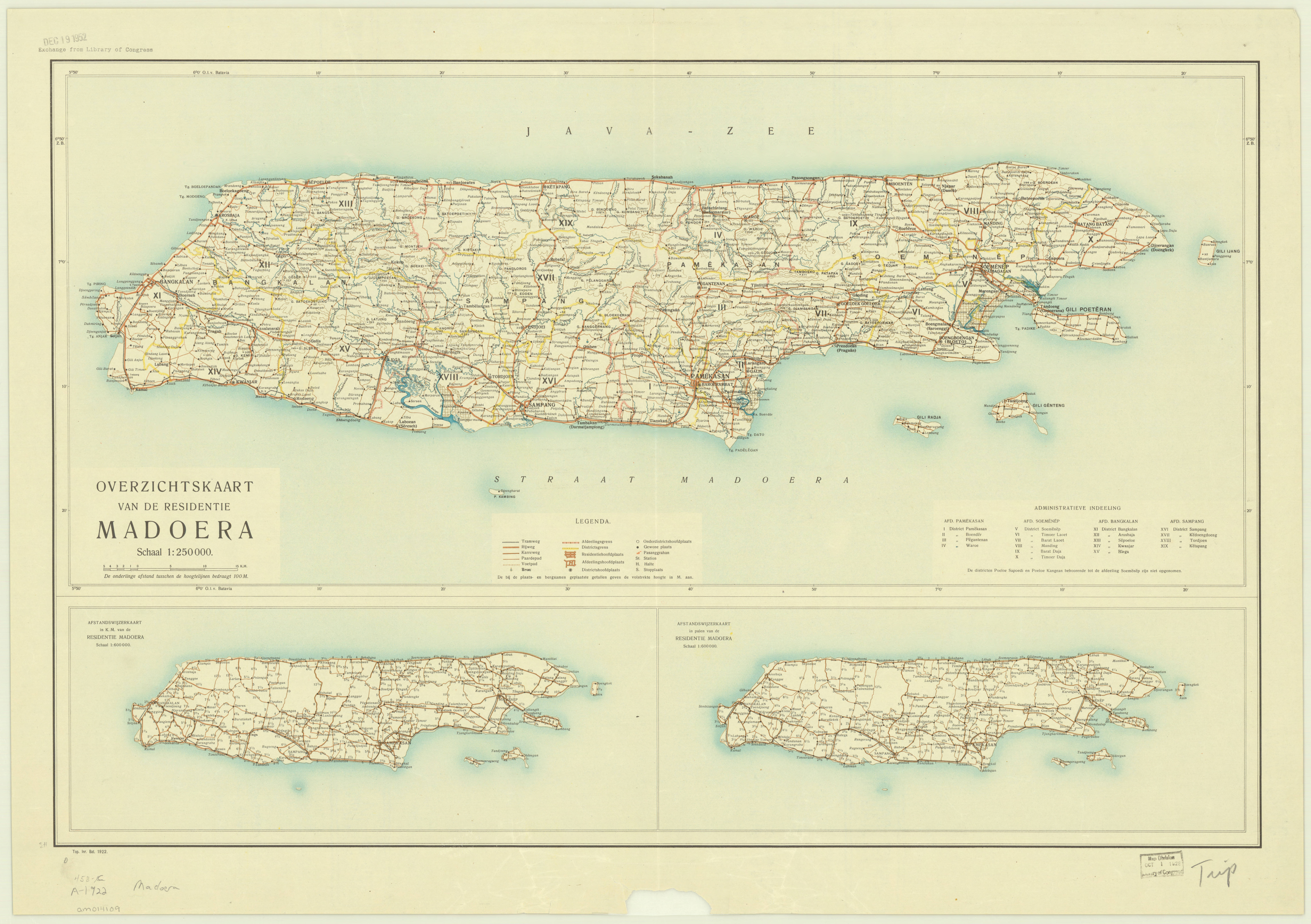
- Map of Madoera Residency in 1922
- Capital: Pamekasan
- History
  - Established: 1857
  - Disestablished: 1948
Succeeded by
State of Madura
- Today part of: Indonesia

Madoera Residency (Dutch: Residentie Madoera) was an administrative subdivision (Residency) of the Dutch East Indies located on the island of Madura and with its capital at Pamekasan. It also included some smaller islands off Madura such as the Kangean Islands and Sapudi Islands. The Residency was divided into 4 districts (afdeelingen): Pamekasan, Bangkalan, Sampang and Soemenep. It existed from the 1880s, when the Dutch established more direct control over the Island, to 1942 when the Japanese invaded the Indies, except for a brief period 1928-31 when it was divided into two smaller residencies (east and west).

== History ==
After the French and British interregnum in the Dutch East Indies, the Dutch regained influence over Madura in the 1820s and continued to support the Sultan of Sumenep in exchange for troops and support against other native kingdoms. Their influence over the island was run from nearby Surabaya. However, the Dutch gradually expanded their control over the island and began to sideline the Sultan; in 1853 they instituted direct Dutch rule over Pamekasan Regency, established a seat of government on the island in 1857, took over taxation of Bangkalan Regency in 1863, and put most of the island under Dutch rule after the death of the Sultan in 1882. Bangkalan was incorporated into direct Dutch rule in 1885.

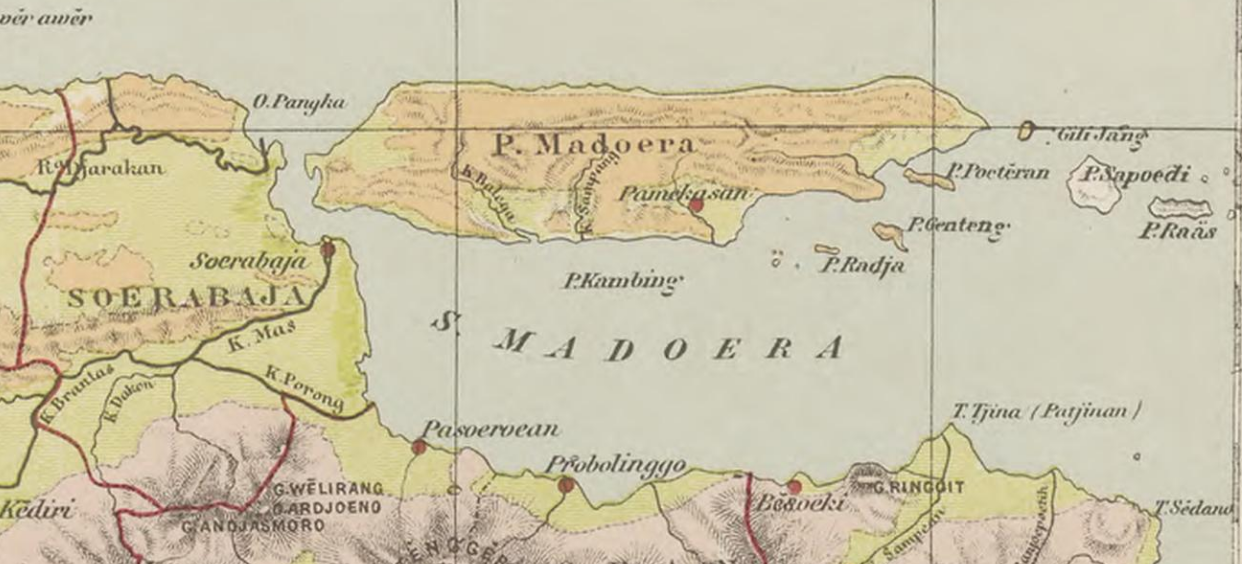
Map of the island of Madura and the coast of East Java from a 1909 Malay language atlas

The main economic exports of the residency in the late nineteenth and early twentieth centuries were salt and cattle. In 1915 the population of the residency was estimated to be 1,830,000, most of whom were Madurese people but also including 4,500 Chinese Indonesians, 1,000 Europeans and 2,000 Arabs.

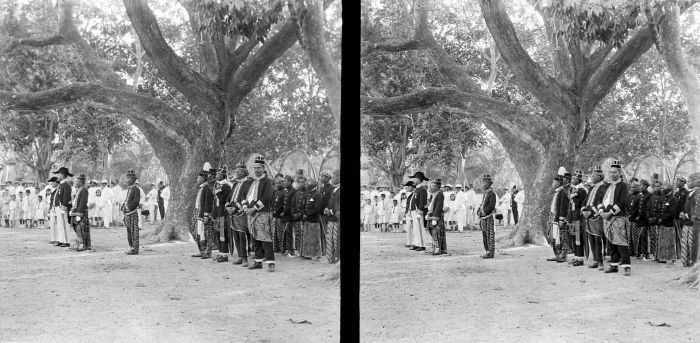
Official parade of Resident and officials in Pamekasan, date unknown

During the period of administrative redistricting after 1925, it was divided in half to two new residencies under Oost-Java province: Oost-Madoera, with its capital at Pamekasan and containing Pamekasan and Sumenep districts, and West-Madoera, with its capital at Bangkalan and containing Bangkalan and Sampang districts. However, after 1931 they were merged once again into a single Residency. By that time its population was estimated at more than 2 million native Indonesians (mostly Madurese), 5000 Chinese Indonesians and around 1000 Europeans. After that, the borders stayed essentially the same until the Japanese occupation of the Dutch East Indies. After the end of World War II, when the Dutch attempted to regain control of the Indies, they turned Madura into one of the provinces of the United States of Indonesia in February 1948. However, that was short-lived, and after the Dutch exit from Indonesia it was incorporated into the Republic of Indonesia in the province of East Java.
