= Kingdom of Manggarai =

Kingdom of Manggarai Kerajaan Manggarai Zelfbesturende landschap van Manggarai
- 1924–1960
- Common languages: Manggarai
- Religion: Roman Catholicism (state religion)
- Demonym: Ata Manggarai
- Government: Elective monarchy
- King
  - 1924-1930: Bagoeng
  - 1930-1949: Alexander Baroek
  - 1949-1960: Constantinius Ngamboet
- History
  - Established: 1924
  - Disestablished: 1960

Area
  - Total: 6,924.18 km^{2} (2,673.44 sq mi)
Succeeded by
Manggarai Regency
- Today part of: Indonesia

The Kingdom of Manggarai (lit. Kerajaan Manggarai) was a polity in Flores, modern-day Indonesia, which largely corresponded to the original Manggarai Regency. It was established when the Dutch, through a longer chain of not always related decisions with the goal of a prosperous Flores, and also with the desire among the Manggarai people to be free from Bima's rule and to have a king chosen from among their own, saw an opportunity to liberate the Manggarai people and create a new monarchy with a locally elected king at its head. After multiple changes in suzerainty, with the Republic of Indonesia as its final sovereign authority, it was finally converted into a regency in 1960 with the deposition of its last king and the subsequent appointment of its first regent.

== Government and Politics ==
The capital of the kingdom was at Ruteng, deliberately chosen by the Dutch in the early stages of the kingdom's establishment as a way to remove the influence of Bima within the region, while also considering its more strategic topography.

It consisted of 38 or 39 autonomous little principalities or regions called dalu (itself a possible corruption of the word datu according to Dami N. Toda) or kedaluan that were further subdivided into smaller regions called the gelarang. Within each dalu were the wa'u, the aristocratic class, that had a person with the rank of karaeng (the title for a prince in the Macassarean tradition, absorbed into the Manggarai language) at its head. Some sources mentioned that the ruler was also called the karaeng dalu or even just dalu.

Meanwhile, the various gelarang were headed by persons with the rank of Tu'a Gelarang (lit. lord elder, also a title for a local ruler under the karaeng in the Macassarean tradition) sometimes shortened to just Gelarang. The Gelarang was responsible for several villages, each of them having a person with the rank of either Tu’a Golo/Tu'a Beo (elder/head of the village) or Tu'a Panga (elder/head of the lineage) which was responsible for the matters external to the village such as taxes, protection and warfare and a person with the rank of Tu'a Teno (elder/leader of the Teno, which is wood symbolizing fertility and the land) which was responsible for religious and spiritual matters and is regarded as the "owner" of the land.

The King was elected by the council of princes from among those sons of the princes (Anak Keraeng) of Todo and Pongkor who have come of age. After Bagoeng, due to the urging of the Catholic missionaries, candidates to the role of crown prince would have to be Catholic. There were plans to have a rotation between the sons of the princes of Todo and Pongkor, when if the previous King was from Pongkor, then the crown prince would have to be from Todo, and vice versa. However, those plans would end up unheeded during the reign of Alexander Baroek, and upon the death of Baroek, since there was no designated crown prince, there was no time to prepare the candidates, and therefore the only candidate suitable for the role of King at the time, Constantinius Ngambut, was elected.

== History ==
=== The Influence of Makassar and Bima ===
The Kingdom of Gowa had always had a presence in the area from an unknown time up until the 17th century, as evidenced by the existence of houses that are of the same form as the ones seen within the Gowa mainland at Sulawesi and the fact that some settlers claim descendantship from there. Though, Gowa never really did rule all of Manggarai, rather only part of the coastlines. At some point in time, the Sultanate of Bima came into Gowa suzerainty, and as an act to secure continued control over Bima, the ruler of Gowa at the time decided to marry off one of his daughters to the Sultan of Bima. As part of the dowry, the part of Manggarai that Gowa ruled over was given as a gift to the Sultan of Bima.

The Sultanate of Bima did not seem to have the intent to spread Islam into Manggarai, instead issuing an edict to the Bugis, Makassar or Bimanese people to stay at Reo, Pota, Bari, Talo or Nangaili, themselves located near the coast, out of fear that the Manggarai people would destroy their religion and customs. Hence there was a division between the Muslims who tend to live near the coast, and the pagans who lived in the interior. The Sultan of Bima would also make Reo the capital, positioning a non-hereditary officer with the title of Naib there to oversee the collection of taxes.

The Manggaraians were frequently taken as slaves as a form of taxation along with horses and wax, and shipped off to Batavia to a region now known as Manggarai. Among the three, slaves and horses were major commodities, with wax being minor. Already during the seventeenth century the number of Manggarai slaves was so big that a district of Jakarta has been named after them.

=== The End of Bimanese Rule in Manggarai ===
The Bimanese had always had a low esteem of the people of Manggarai who lived in the interior. Coolhas wrote about the fact that the people of Manggarai had to go to the coastlines to trade wax, sleeping mats and cinnamon risking themselves to injury and fraud, if they themselves were not reined in for enslavement and that the Bimanese always came to the interior with sizable expeditionary groups, to rob for their own profit, which the Bimanese characterized as the collection of fines, and to incite one dalu region against another, which in turn would result in even more of the so-called fines. The Sultan of Bima also disallowed the Manggarai from doing direct trade with the outside world, reserving it only for the Bimanese. The Manggarai did attempt to resist. After the eruption of Mount Tambora in 1815 weakened Bima, the Bimanese tried around the middle of the century to restore their control and demanded even more slaves, but met considerable resistance for the first time. It was organised by the keraeng ruler of the dalu principality of Todo and his allies, whose territory became a refuge for people fleeing Bimanese control, and in the 1890s Todo fought several battles against Bima, which was in turn aided by Todo's old rival, Cibal. Lack of unity among the Manggarai principalities, which often turned against one another, undermined these efforts, and Manggarai remained under nominal Bimanese overlordship into the twentieth century.

The Dutch, for their part, had long been content to leave the region to Bima, but by the late 19th century the power of Bima was weakening. The regions of Flores, including Manggarai, had never been a lucrative place for the Dutch to raise taxes; however, as the need for revenue grew, the region came under scrutiny. In 1907 the Dutch arrived to take direct control, during the Perang Pasifikasi campaign, which was launched in response to an attack on the Posthouder of Ende by Kakadoepa. During this campaign, Dutch Controleur A. Couvreur wrote from Ngada letters to Catholic Mission at Larantuka, asking them to consider starting missionary work at Manggarai so that the region can be made Christian, increasing in urgency due to his desire to remove the Muslim Bima influence over the fertile but pagan interior of Manggarai, to the point where he used the name of the leader of the campaign, Captain Hans Christoffel, writing that in his name he would have given the opportunity to the protestant church of Batavia if the Catholics would not take the initiative.

In addition to this, the official for the development of the Outer Islands, Hendrik Colijn, came to Larantuka and presented a plan that would involve the Catholic Church taking the stewardship of the system of schools in Flores and the eastern section of Timor, along with generous subsidies to maintain it. Initially distrustful of the colonial administration due to them exiling the Larantukan King Dom Lorenzo II, describing the act as akin to a foreign army attacking Holland and taking Queen Wilhelmina as prisoner, they eventually relented and sent local teachers trained at the local schools of Larantuka and Sikka-Lela to start the schools at Manggarai.

In 1913, during the time when the lands of Manggarai were separated administratively from the mainland of the Sultanate of Bima, the Dutch decided to suggest to the Sultan of Bima to replace the non-hereditary viceroy naib with a son of the Sultan of Bima as a true ruler of the region. One of the princes, Abdul Kadiem, was designated as candidate and sent to the sekolah radja at Makassar to be trained for the then-future role. Due to his early death, the younger brother of the Sultan of Bima, Nasaroeddin, became his replacement.

Some time in 1924, seeing the great success of the christianization of pagan Manggarai, the Dutch went to the then Sultan of Bima, Muhammad Salahhoedin, to instead ask him to release the land of Manggarai with the promise that lands of the Sultanate of Sanggar will be given to him as compensation in the future, to which he agreed. Thus in 1924, along with the election and appointment of Keraeng Bagoeng as King, much to the disappointment of keraeng Tamur which was the ruler of the Dalu principality of Todo which held more prominence at the time and also the viceroy naib Abdullah Daeng Mananja who administrated the coastline settlements in the name of the Sultan of Bima, the lands of Manggarai were relinquished from Bimanese suzerainty and at October 1926 with the death of its final Sultan, the Sultanate of Sanggar was abolished, its lands included within the dominion of the Sultanate of Bima. Karel Steenbrink also mentioned that the lands of the Sultanate of Dompu were to be included as additional compensation for the loss of Manggarai, citing the death of its Sultan in 1934. However, Sultan Muhammad Sirajuddin of Dompu who ruled at the time was not deceased but was exiled to Kupang by the Dutch East Indies Government, where he later died on 14 February 1937. Furthermore, Dompu was not formally incorporated into Bima under Dutch rule. Instead, the Dutch established a Zelfbestuur Commission consisting of six members, including Muhammad Tajul Arifin Sirajuddin (grandson of the exiled sultan), to administer the territory. The actual merger of Dompu with Bima occurred only under Japanese occupation in 1942.

=== The Reign of Bagoeng ===
Bagoeng of Pongkor was appointed the first king of the self-governing zelfbestuur of Manggarai, reigning from 1924 to 1930. King Bagoeng initiated the modernization of Manggarai, including the planning of the capital, the construction of mess halls, offices, hospitals, schools, shops, mission houses, churches, and the opening up of Manggarai to the outside world without leaving behind its traditions. On 20 December 1929 he signed the Korte Verklaring (Short Declaration), acknowledging Dutch sovereignty over Manggarai. Assisting him were Keraeng princes, including Keraeng Po, who was elected as the King's Assistant by the council of princes at Pongkor. It was also mentioned that he improved the arabica coffee plantations in the region, to the point where it was known as one of the best in the world at the time.

During the same princely council that elected Bagoeng as King, due to the urging from both the missionaries and the Dutch, the position of Crown Prince was also decided, with Keraeng Alexander Baroek being unanimously elected to the role, chosen from among the sons of the Keraeng princes (Anak Keraeng), who themselves held the princely Keraeng rank bestowed upon them by being of age. For the missionaries it was critical that the next king was to be Catholic, and the selection of someone with the Christian name Alexander was welcomed by the missionaries. Baroek was then sent to the mission school (Sekolah Radja) at Ende, at the expense of the karaeng princes to prepare himself for his future role as king.

=== The Coronation and Reign of Alexander Baroek ===
On the 13th of November 1930, after being educated in the mission schools, Alexander Baroek, the son of keraeng Tamur, was coronated as king, which missionaries described as the greatest triumph in the history of the mission in the area at the time, and also to the people of the Dalu principality of Todo, as it represented the return of Todo primacy over the region. The ceremonies lasted for two whole days and involved the screening of two films, a gladiatorial ritual dance known as "Main Tjatji," musical accompaniment by the military, and multiple feasts. Present at the event were the Resident of Timor and Dependencies, the gezaghebber (Governor) of Manggarai, various military and government officials, church leaders, 38 keraeng which were the rulers of the Dalu principalities of Manggarai, and King Alexander Baroek with his Manadonese wife, the Queen. The Keraeng princes in particular wore their great costumes to the event, with lavishly embroidered jackets, various headdresses, and gold ornaments for this important ceremonial occasion.

During his rule, he set out to improve the farming within the region, introducing modern irrigation and cash crop cultivation. He lived in a residence modeled after the traditional Manggaraian house, substantially modernized in form, featuring walls and windows, though retaining a sugar palm fibre roof instead of having it be metal to demonstrate his willingness to live like village folk who cannot afford them. The residence was built in the 1930s on land with an area of 118.7 square meters and 1.182 meters above sea level.

King Emeritus Bagoeng was still alive when Alexander Baroek became king. Therefore he was relegated as Raja Bicara (analogous to the position of Prime Minister in Bimanese tradition). Couvreur remarked that even until his ripe old age, he was still working hard as an administrator of the region.

=== The Rulership of Ngambut and its Dissolution by Republican Authorities ===
Upon the death of Alexander Baroek, a new King would have to be chosen, since there was no designated crown prince at the time, due to the fact that there was no election for the position during Alexander Baroek's reign. Again, the king-elect was to be chosen from the Catholic sons of the keraeng princes who held by themselves the princely title of Keraeng as well. However, Keraeng Constantinius Ngambut, who was working within the administration at the time, was the only elegible candidate. Henceforth, there was no need for a council to be convened, and Constantinius Ngambut was to be king in the year of 1949. The reign of Constantinus Ngambut saw the gradual transition period of the kingdom, with the end of his reign being its final conversion to a regency with Carolus Hamboer being appointed as its regent in 1960.

== Legacy ==
Although the Todo royal family no longer ruled, they remain influential within the political and cultural sphere in the region. Their residences before they moved to Ruteng has been made into a tourist attraction. The original houses collapsed in the 1960s, and the main house, the niang wowang, was rebuilt beginning in 1991.

The keraeng title used by the princely nobility of Manggarai is now not limited to them, but also used as an honorary greeting to older males. The residence of King Alexander Baroek was initially used as an office for the Regent, but was relegated as a minor administrative office after new buildings were erected. In late 1992 the residence burnt down, but then was completely restored. Mentioned as the Istana in the local government tourism website, it was not only used as a museum but as a location for restorative justice by the Regent Herybertus G. L. Nabit.
