= Bencoolen (ship) =

At least three ships have been named Bencoolen, the first two probably for British Bencoolen:

- Bencoolen, a snow, of 14 guns, built 1776 or 1778 at Bombay Dockyard for the British East India Company (EIC).
- Bencoolen, launched in 1818 and broken up in 1845. In between she made one voyage transporting convicts to New South Wales, and one voyage for the EIC.
- Bencoolen was a ship of 1455 tons launched at New Brunswick in 1855 that wrecked at Bude, Cornwall, on 21 October 1862 with the loss of the lives of 27 of the 33 members of her crew.
