= Tomb of Lepejou =

Tomb in Overijssel, Netherlands

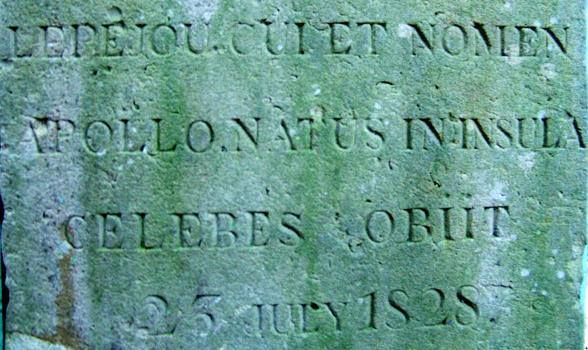
- Text written on the gravestone of Lepejou
- Interactive map of the Tomb of Lepejou area

General information
- Type: Tomb
- Location: Haerst, Overijssel, Netherlands
- Coordinates: 52.541957°N 6.138710°E

The Tomb of Lepejou is the oldest Muslim burial site in the Netherlands, dating back to 1828. The grave is located on the Huize Arnichem Estate outside the hamlet of Haerst, which is under the municipal jurisdiction of Zwolle.

== Lepejou ==
Lepejou was a historical figure born circa 1805 on the island of Sulawesi in the former Dutch East Indies. (Note: Dutch sources state that Lepejou died at the age of 23 years. The difference between his death year of 1828 and his death age of 23 gives an approximate birth year of 1805.) Lepejou died on 23 July 1828. Lepejou was born from parents named August and Jeanette and he was sold as a slave in British Guiana. Although Lepejou was from Sulawesi, his death certificate incorrectly stated that he was born in Boegis.

== Folklore ==
Numerous Dutch publications have reported local folklore surrounding the tomb of Lepejou. Oral histories relate that Lepejou saved the life of Joan Hendrik Tobias, the historic owner of the Huize Arnichem Estate. As a way of saying thanks, Joan Hendrik Tobias subsequently brought Lepejou from Sulawesi to the Netherlands.

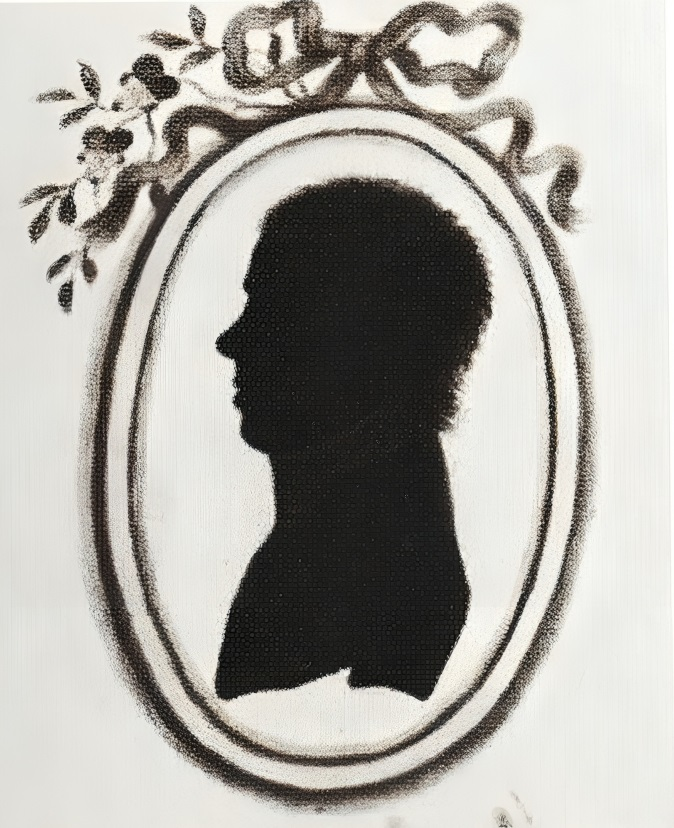
A silhouette portrait of Joan Hendrik Tobias as depicted in an 1801 family tree

== Tombstone features ==
The grave consists of two stones. On the first stone is a Latin text, which translated reads: "Lepejou, also called Apolloon, was born on the island of Celebes and died on July 23, 1828." On the second stone is an Arabic text, which translated reads: "The lord has his most loyal servant dedicated this tomb, because he is grateful to him and always thinks of him."

== Burial site ==
In 1979, the grave was dug up and vandalized: both stones were broken and the tomb was partially opened. At this time, the skull was also stolen from the grave.

== In archives ==
The legal death certificate of Lepejou is held in the Historical Center Overijssel in Zwolle.

== See also ==
- Grave robbery
- Islam in the Netherlands
- Islamophobia in Europe
