= Benkoelen Residency =

Administrative subdivision of the Dutch West Indies

Benkoelen Residency Residentie Benkoelen
- Residency of Dutch East Indies
- 1824–1942
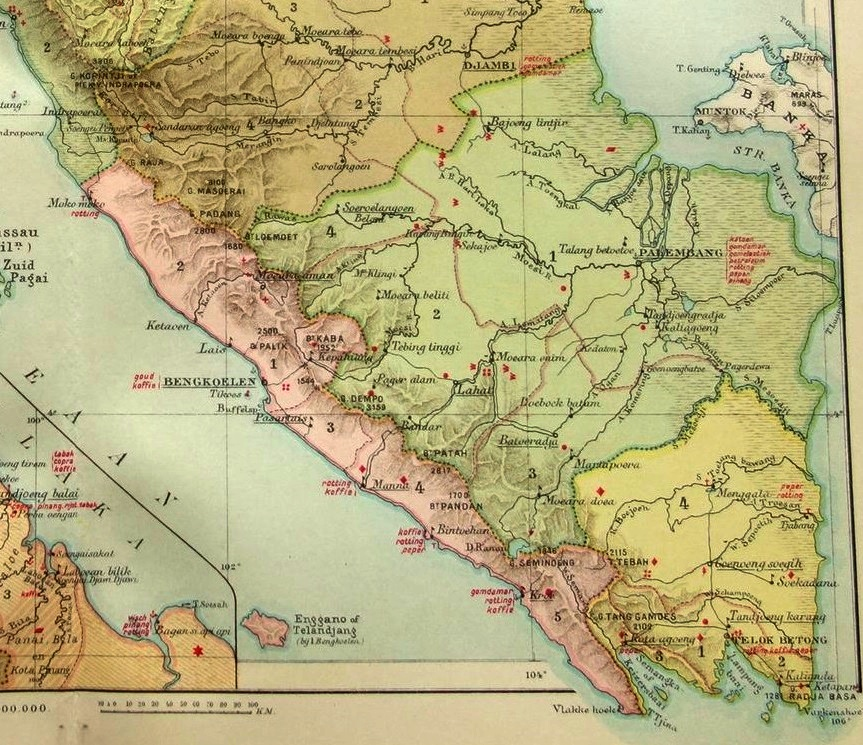
- Map of Benkoelen ressidentie

Anthem
- Wien Neêrlands Bloed (Dutch) (1824–1932) (English: "Those in Whom Dutch Blood") Wilhelmus (Dutch) (1932–1942)
- Capital: Benkoelen
- History
  - Anglo-Dutch Treaty of 1824: 2 June 1824
  - Invasion of Sumatra: 14 February – 28 March 1942
- Today part of: Bengkulu; Lampung (Pesisir Barat)

Benkoelen Residency (Dutch: Residentie Benkoelen), also spelled Bencoolen, was an administrative subdivision of the Dutch East Indies, covering the present-day province of Bengkulu and western part of Lampung (Pesisir Barat), Indonesia. Benkoelen was a British colony before they ceded it to the Netherlands in the Anglo-Dutch Treaty of 1824. It was one of the control centers of the Dutch before independence, though after independence it became the resident of Bengkulu prefect. Initially, it was a part of Sumatra, later part of Southern Sumatra. Further, on the demand of Bengkulu Struggle Agency and according to Law no. 9/1967 Junkto Government Regulation no. 20/1968, Bengkulu became an all-new province, thereby making the Benkoelen Residency a part of it.

== History ==
On 17 August 1945, proclamation of independence of the Republic of Indonesia announced to the international world by Sukarno and Mohammad Hatta. On the following day, Sukarno and Mohammad Hatta was elected as the President and Vice President of Indonesia respectively. On 20 August 1945, this news was officially accepted in the city of Bengkulu followed by the establishment of a government agency for compiling the Republic of Indonesia in Bengkulu.

On 13 October 1945, Ir. Indra Tjaya was appointed as the prefect of Sumatra by T.M. Hasan (Governor of Sumatra, North Sumatra) as well as the resident of Bengkulu. After his appointment, he entered into a negotiations with the Resident of Bengkulu, Z. Inomata to submit the Residency area to the Government of the Republic of Indonesia. After a few negotiations, on 27 October 1945, Bengkulu Residency have been submitted by the Japanese government to the government of the Republic of Indonesia.

In early 1946, government of Republic of Indonesia faced a crisis, National Day Labor Agency of Indonesia (BPHNI) demands the reorganization of government throughout the Prefecture of Bengkulu, thereby forcing Indra Tjaya to resign his post. He also left the Bengkulu Residency after that.

On 28 April 1946, Hazairin (Chairman of the District Court Sibolga–Bengkulu Regional Son) was appointed as a Resident of Bengkulu by T.M. Hasan. Mr. Hazairin immediately took control of the messy situation and started rearranging the local governments wisely without harming the interests of any parties.

On 15 April 1948, Sumatra province is divided into 3 (three) provinces, namely North Sumatra, Central Sumatra, and South Sumatra Province. Bengkulu Residency became the part of Southern Sumatra.

On 19 December 1948, the Dutch broke the Renville agreement by attacking areas of the Republic of Indonesia which was not yet occupied, including the Residency Bengkulu, thereby forcing the resident of Bengkulu Residency Mr.Hazairin to retreat to the town of Muara Aman and Government of South Sumatra Province was also transferred to the City of Muara Aman.

On 26 November 1949, in South Bengkulu formed a military delegation led by Lieutenant Colonel Barlian, Commander Sub Territorium Bengkulu, to accept the handover of the entire area of Bengkulu from the Netherlands.

On 27 December 1949, Bengkulu Residency is recovered and Regent M. Hasan was appointed as a resident of Bengkulu.

In 1962, a group of local community leaders formed Bengkulu Struggle Agency with a demand to make Bengkulu as a province.

On 18 November 1968, on the basis of Law no. 9/1967 Junkto Government Regulation no. 20/1968, Bengkulu Residency officially become one of the province in the Republic of Indonesia, with Ali Amin as Governor of Bengkulu.
