= 1823 in Singapore =

- Decades: 1820s; 1840s
- See also: Other events of 1823; Timeline of Singaporean history

Events from the year 1823 in Singapore.

== Incumbents ==
- Resident: Maj-Gen. William Farquhar (until 1 May), Dr. John Crawfurd (starting 27 May)

== Events ==
=== May ===
- 1 May - William Farquhar was dismissed from his position as First Resident by Stamford Raffles .

=== June ===
- 5 June - Stamford Raffles lays the foundation stone for the Singapore Institution, now known as the Raffles Institution.

== See also ==
- List of years in Singapore
