= Bantam Residency =

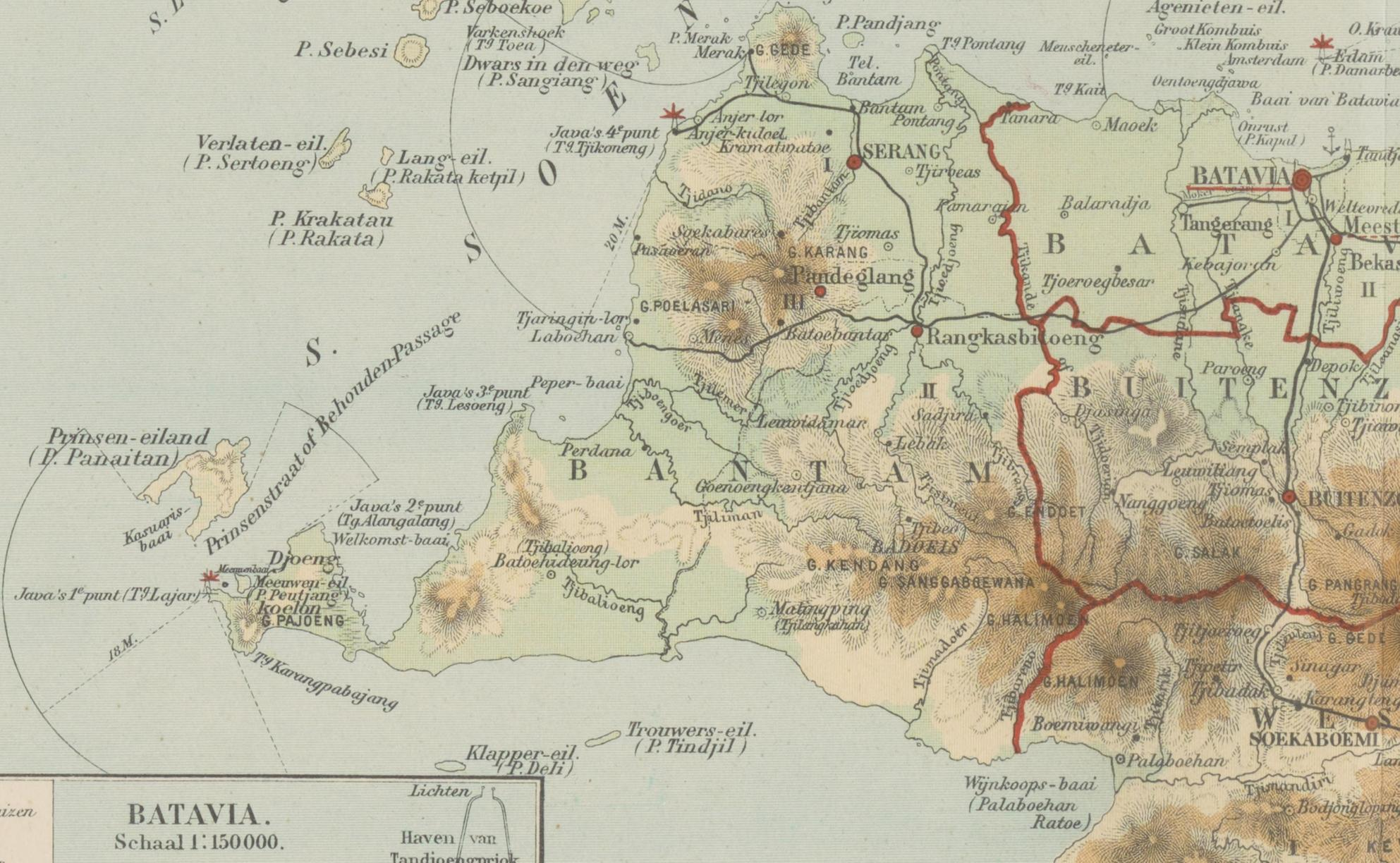
1928 map of Bantam Residency from Schoolatlas van Nederlandsch Indië

Bantam Residency (Dutch: Residentie Bantam), sometimes spelled Banten Residency, was an administrative division (Residency) of the Dutch East Indies which existed from 1817 to 1942; it was located at the western point of Java and its capital was at Serang. Its borders largely correspond to the present-day Indonesian province of Banten.

== History ==
=== Prehistory ===
Prior to the imposition of Dutch rule on the region, Banten was home to the Banten Sultanate; that kingdom turned away Portuguese efforts to establish a foothold there in the sixteenth century, and later clashed with the Mataram Sultanate. The British East India Company had a presence there during the seventeenth century, the Bantam Presidency. As the Dutch East India Company expanded their areas of control across Java, Banten signed a treaty in 1659 establishing a border between them and the Dutch-controlled areas, and the British were forced to withdraw. Later on, trade from Banten in the Sunda Strait continued to be immensely successful that the Dutch founded Batavia partly to try to move trade away from it and towards them. Over time, as Dutch power increased, they demanded territorial concessions from Banten as well, culminating in recognition of Dutch Suzerainty in 1774. It was the period of the French and British interregnum in the Dutch East Indies that ended the rule of Banten; the northern coast was conquered in 1808, and the rest of the former sultanate came under direct European rule when Stamford Raffles invaded it 1813.

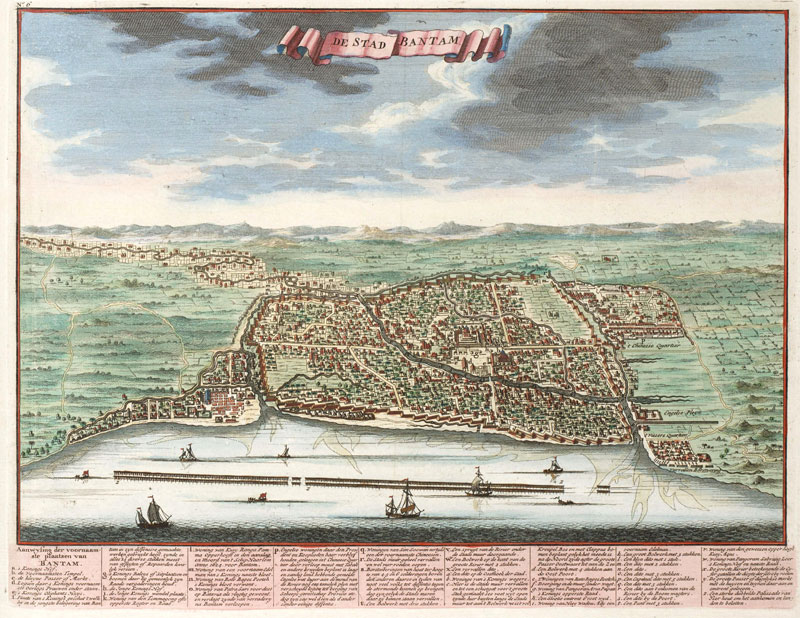
Banten city in 1724

=== Residency ===
After the Dutch regained control of Java in 1816, they began to create a new Residency system; by 1819 the new Bantam Residency was divided into northern and southern Regencies which in turn were divided into districts and sub-districts.

The Residency was faced with a number of catastrophes in the late nineteenth century. In 1881–2 there was a cattle plague which led to widespread famine, followed by a fever epidemic which killed ten per cent of the population. The 1883 eruption of Krakatoa took a heavy toll on Bantam Residency, as the island the volcano is located on is not far from it; a number of coastal areas were destroyed, more than twenty thousand of its residents died, and the coastline was permanently altered. Aside from that catastrophe, in general Bantam was the least populated part of Java during the late nineteenth century; it had the lowest population density of any residency in Java in 1890. The Residency was connected by railway with Batavia and other parts of Java in 1900 and 1906, which increased agricultural exploitation.

Bantam Residency managed to avoid the restructuring and subdivision of a number of other residencies in Java, keeping essentially the same borders from the nineteenth century to the end of Dutch rule. It ceased to be a Dutch residency with the Japanese occupation of the Dutch East Indies in 1942; after the war, when Indonesia gained its independence, it became the new province of Banten with essentially the same borders as the former Residency.

== List of residents ==
- Jacobus de Bruin: 1817–1818
- Cornelis Vos: 1818–1819
- James du Puij: 1819–1819
- Joan Hendrik Tobias: 1819–1821
- Pieter van de Poel: 1821–1822
- Annius Abrahami de Melverda: 1822–1827
- Franciscus Henricus Smulders: 1827–1835
- Johan Frans Hora Siccama: 1835–1837
- Martinus Hendrikus Halewijn: 1837–1838
- Johan Frans Hora Siccama: 1838–1839
- Carel Frederik Goldman: 1839–1844
- Dirk Adolph Buijn: 1844–1851
- Gerrit Anthonij Everhardus Wiggers: 1851–1855
- Carel Pieter Brest van Kempen: 1855–1857
- Johan Carel van Lannoij: 1857–1861
- Oscar van Polanen Petel: 1861–1865
- Johan Hendrik van der Palm: 1865–1872
- Bastiaan van Baak: 1872–1874
- Felix Ernest Parmenas van den Bossche: 1874–1877
- Willem Frederik van Andel: 1877–1878
- Johannes Petrus Metman: 1878–1881
- Adrianus Johannes Spaan: 1881–1884
- Eduard Alexander Engelbrecht: 1884–1888
- Jacobus Albertus Velders: 1888–1892
- Bernard Hendrik Huibert Ravenswaay: 1892–1892
- Jacobus Albertus Velders: 1892–1895
- Johannes Anthonie Hardeman: 1895–1906
- Frederik Karel Overduijn: 1906–1911
- Cornelis Willem August van Rinsum: 1911–1913
- Herman Lodewijk Cornelis Bernard van Vleuten: 1913–1916
- Berend Leonardus van Bijlevelt: 1916–1918
- Willem Christiaan Thieme: 1918–1920
- Cornelis Canne: 1920–1921
- Theodorus Arnoldusster: 1921–1922
- Jan Christiaan Bedding: 1922–1925
- Frederik Gerhard Putman Cramer: 1925–1931
- Jan Scipio de Kanter: 1931–1934
- Armand Maurice van der Elst: 1934–1937
- Jan Robert van Beusekom: 1937–1941
- Willem Hendrik Coert: 1941–1942
