= Lorenzo II of Larantuka =

Lorenzo II
- Raja Dom
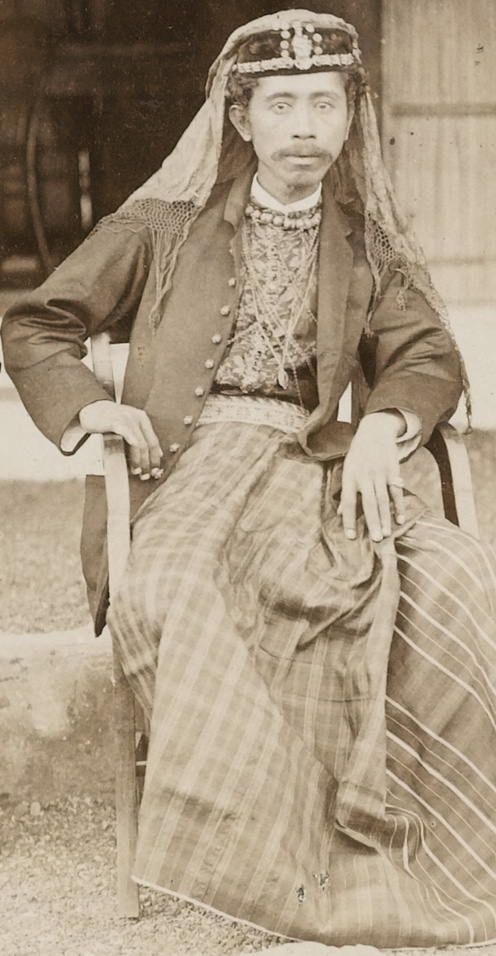
- Lorenzo II, c. 1890

King of Larantuka
- Reign: 14 September 1887 - 1 July 1904
- Predecessor: Dominggo
- Successor: Louis Belantran de Rosari (as Acting Raja)
- Born: Lorenzo Diaz Vieria Godinho; July 1859; Larantuka
- Died: 1910 (aged 50/51); Java
- Spouse: Unknown; Johanna Maria da Silva
- Issue: Catharina of Larantuka; Magdalena of Larantuka; Servus, Raja of Larantuka
- House: Royal House of Larantuka
- Father: Dom Quino /Johan Kinu
- Religion: Roman Catholicism

Styles of Lorenzo II of Larantuka
- Reference style: His Majesty
- Spoken style: Your Majesty
- Alternative style: Raja

Dom Lorenzo II of Larantuka (c. 1859–1904), born Lorenzo Diaz Vieria Godinho, was a Raja of the Kingdom of Larantuka and reigned for almost 17 years starting from 14 September 1887.

He was born in July 1859, baptized on 20 October 1869, and was educated by a Jesuit priest. When his uncle Gaspar died in 1877, Lorenzo (then 17 years old) was the presumptive heir, but the kingship instead passed on to Gaspar's half-brother Dominggo. Prior to his succession to the throne on Dominggo's death in 1887, he taught catechism in Lembata, and helped defend coastal settlements there against raids from inland non-Christians. Travelling with an accompanying Catholic priest, the party baptized mostly children in Lembata and Solor.

Lorenzo's reign saw several rules being implemented in Larantuka, which included alterations in traditional ceremonies, punishments for those practicing traditional rituals, and requiring all his subjects to provide labor for the Kingdom. Showing clear traits of independence, he attempted to extract taxes from territories belonging to the nearby Raja of Sikka and to Maumere, led groups of men to intervene in local conflicts, and refused to conduct sacrifices in the manner his predecessors did for the non-Catholic natives. Eventually, colonial authorities responded by deposing and exiling him to Java, 1 July 1904, where he died six years later. He was replaced by acting Raja Louis Balantaran de Rozari.
