= Kingdom of Larantuka =

Former kingdom in East Nusa Tenggara

Kingdom of Larantuka Reino de Larantuca Regnum Larantucanum Ilimandiri Larantuka Kerajaan Larantuka
- 1515–1962
- Royal anthem: "Domine, Salvum Fac Regem"
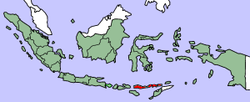
- Location of Flores and surrounding islands in Indonesia
- Capital: Larantuka
- Common languages: Portuguese (official language during its time as a tributary state of the Portuguese Empire); Larantuka Malay; Lamaholot; Dutch (official language during its time as a tributary state (zelfbestuur) of the Dutch East Indies); Indonesian (official language during its time as an autonomous region of the State of East Indonesia and of Indonesia)
- Religion: Roman Catholicism (state religion)
- Government: Elective monarchy
- Raja
  - ?–1768: Dom Gaspar Dias Vieira Godinho
  - 1768–?: Dom Manuel Dias Vieira Godinho
  - before 1812–?: Dom André Dias Vieira Godinho
  - (1831)–1838/1849: Colonel Dom Lorenzo Dias Vieira Godinho
  - (1838)–1861: Dom André II Dias Vieira Godinho
  - 1861–1877: Dom Gaspar II Dias Vieira Godinho
  - 1878–1887: Dom Dominggo (Ence)/Dom Domingus Dias Vierra Godinho
  - 1887–1904: Dom Lorenzo II Dias Vierra Godinho
  - 1912–1919: Dom Johannus Servus Diaz Vierra Godinho
  - 1938–1962: Dom Lorenzo Oesi Diaz Vieira Godinho III (Dom Lorenzo III)
- Regent/Acting Raja
  - before 1785–1812: Dom Constantino Balantran de Rozari
  - 1904—1906: Louis Balantran de Rozari
  - 1906—1912: Johan (Johannes) Balantran de Rosari
  - 1919–1938: Antonius Belantran de Rosari
- Vice-Raja
  - 1912–1919: Johan (Johannes) Balantran de Rosari
- History
  - Portuguese arrival: 1515
  - Conversion to Roman Catholicism: 1650
  - Purchase by Dutch East Indies: 1859
  - Signing of the first long political contract with the Dutch East Indies after the purchase: 1861
  - Reduced autonomy through the signing of the korte verklaring: 1912
  - Converted to a daerah swapraja (autonomous region) within the State of East Indonesia: 1946
  - Control transferred to the Republic of Indonesia: 1950
  - Converted into a kecamatan (district) by Republican Authorities: 1962
- Today part of: Indonesia

The Kingdom of Larantuka was a historical monarchy in present-day East Nusa Tenggara, Indonesia. It was one of the few, if not the only, indigenous Roman Catholic polities in the territory of modern Indonesia. Acting as a tributary state of the Portuguese Crown, the raja (king) of Larantuka controlled holdings on the islands of Flores (eastern part), Solor, Adonara, and Lembata. It was later purchased by Dutch East Indies from the Portuguese with the treaty of Lisbon in 1859.

Despite its autonomy being reduced over the years, first with the signing of the long political contract with the Dutch East Indies after the purchase and then the short contract (korte verklaring) the kingdom's royal family retained nominal authority over their territories until their power was formally abolished by the republican government in 1962.

== History ==
=== Precolonial period ===
Monarchs of the Larantuka kingdom claim descent from a union between a man from the Kingdom of Belu (Manuaman Lakaan Fialaran) in the north-central Timor or the Kingdom of Malaka (Wewiku–Wehali) in the south-central Timor, and a mythical woman from a nearby extinct volcano of Ile Mandiri. Traditional belief systems and rituals of the Lamaholot people who were their subjects place the rajas in a central role, especially for those who adhered to traditional beliefs.

In the Javanese Negarakertagama, the locations Galiyao and Solot were mentioned to be "east of Bali" and are believed to correspond to the approximate region, indicating some form of contact from tributary relations or trading between the region and the Majapahit Empire, due to its location in the trade routes carrying sandalwood from nearby Timor. Influences from the powerful Ternate Sultanate were also believed to be present.

=== Portuguese vassal ===
Western presence in the region started with the Portuguese, who captured Malacca in 1511. As they began trading for the sandalwood at Timor, their presence in the region increased. Solor was described by Tomé Pires in his Suma Oriental, although some scholars believe he was referring to nearby larger Flores, mentioning the abundance of exported sulphur and foodstuffs. By 1515, there was trade between both Flores and Solor with the foreigners, and by 1520 a small Portuguese settlement had been constructed in Lifau, at Timor. The Portuguese traders were in conflict with the Dominicans in Solor, because they were more interested in trade than in Christianization. The trade in sandalwood also attracted Chinese and Dutch along with nearer Makassarese of Gowa, creating competition. This competition forced the Portuguese traders to leave Solor and settled in Larantuka, briefly before the 1600s. The Makassarese attacked and captured Larantuka in 1541 to extend their control over the sandalwood trade. Then, in 1613, the Dutch destroyed the Portuguese base at Solor before establishing themselves at modern Kupang. With the occupation of Solor and the transfer of Dominican troops to Larantuka, two waves of immigration brought additional population. As the Dutch conquered Malacca in 1641, many Portuguese moved to Larantuka. Two villages, Wureh and Konga, accommodated the new arrivals. As the Dutch attacked Makassarese in 1660, most of the Portuguese from there also came to Larantuka. The Portuguese took indigenous wives, but they always wrote down the Portuguese ancestry. This new population group was called Topasses, but they called themselves Larantuqueiros (inhabitants of Larantuka). The Dutch called them Zwarte Portugeesen (lit. 'Black Portuguese').

The Larantuqueiros turned out a loose, but mighty power in the region, which influence reached far beyond the settlement. The core cell was the federation of Larantuka, Wureh, and Konga. Theoretically they were subordinated to Portugal. But in practice they were free. They had no Portuguese administration and they did not pay taxes. Letters of the Lisbon government were ignored. For long years there was a bloody struggle for power between the families, da Costa and da Hornay. At the end they shared the power. The Larantuqueiros made 'alliances' with the indigenous people of Flores and Timor.

They followed a certain strategy; the most notable raja Ola Adobala who was brought up under Portuguese education, traditionally the ninth in the pedigree of the rajas was converted to Roman Catholicism and baptized during the reign of Peter II of Portugal (while present-day traditional celebrations place his baptism at 1650 instead), by military pressure. He had to take an oath of allegiance to the king of Portugal and there on the title Dom was granted to him. The raja was allowed to rule his folk autonomously, but in war he had to supply auxiliary forces. In addition, Portuguese sources mention a Dom Constantino between 1625 and 1661, which implies that Adobala may not be the first in the line of Catholic monarchs of Larantuka. Other monarch names mentioned are Dom Luis (1675) and Dom Domingos Viera (1702). The Dominican Order was vital in the spread of Roman Catholicism in the area until their later replacement in the 19th century.

The polity maintained some form of a closed-port policy for outsiders in the late 17th century. There were also some interactions with the nearby Bima Sultanate, whose the sultan enforced his suzerainty over parts of western Flores (especially the land of the Manggarai people) in 1685. Territories of the kingdom were not contiguous and was interspersed by the holdings of several lesser polities, some of them are Muslims. They also established Portuguese as the official language to distance themselves from the natives. The language of commerce was the Malay language, which was understood on the surrounding islands. This inspired the formation of the Malay-based creole language, Larantuka Malay and its neighbor Maumere Malay (Sikka).

=== Dutch and Indonesian periods ===
By 1851, debts incurred by the Portuguese colony in East Timor motivated the Portuguese authorities to 'sell' territories covered by Larantuka to the Dutch East Indies, and the transfer was made by 1859 ceding the Portuguese claim/suzerainty over parts of Flores and the island range stretching from Alor to Solor for 200,000 florins and some Dutch holdings in Timor. The treaty also confirmed that the Catholic inhabitants of the region will remain so under the authority of Protestant Netherlands, and the Dutch authorities sent Jesuit priests to the area so they could engage in missionary works, starting in Larantuka with the building of the first rectory. They reintroduced a more orthodox form of Catholicism to the region. Monogamy was reinforced due their influence. The missionaries built Catholic schools and brought health care.

The Dutch sent a military and administrative officer, who took residence in a small fort, but they did not influence much of the population. Since Larantuka offered little promise, after the downturn of the sandalwood trade. Locals turned to farming as there was little left of the once lucrative foreign trade.

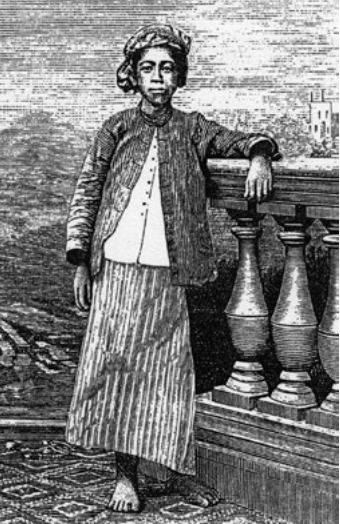
Crown Prince Lorenzo II of Larantuka, aged 12. Drawing of a photograph taken 1871 in Surabaya.

On 14 September 1887, a new raja Dom Lorenzo Diaz Vieria Godinho ascended to the throne as Lorenzo II, who was educated by Jesuit priests. Showing clear traits of independence, he attempted to extract taxes from territories belonging to a nearby Raja of Sikka, led groups of men to intervene in local conflicts, and refused to conduct sacrifices in the manner his predecessors did for the non-Catholic natives. Eventually, colonial authorities responded by deposing and exiling him to Java in 1904, where he died six years later. He was replaced by acting Raja Louis Balantaran de Rozari.

With the independence of Indonesia, the Larantuqueiros gained new influence. They were able to reach leading positions, because they had a higher level of education than then natives. Even the Indonesian language, which became the new official language, was easy for them, because it is very similar to the Malay language. The royal family retained nominal authority over their own autonomous region (daerah swapraja) post-Indonesian independence, until it was abolished de facto starting 1 July 1962 based on the Governor's Decree of East Nusa Tenggara dated 28 February 1962 No. Pem. 66/l/2 and amended on 2 July 1962 No. Pem. 66/l/33 concerning the formation of districts in East Nusa Tenggara’s autonomous region. The de jure abolition followed later on 1 September 1965 with the enactment of Law No. 18 Year 1965 regarding regional government administration. The last reigning raja at the time was Dom Lorenzo III and henceforth, the title of raja became titular.

=== Political structure ===
The Kingdom of Larantuka consisted of the central core and a number of hereditary constituent princedoms forming its dependencies.

The core was originally divided into five parts: Lokea, Lewonama/Lanama, Waibalun, Balela, and Lewerang, with Lokea occupying the central position and surrounded by the other four. Lokea, together with eight additional villages (Posto, Pohonsirih, Pohonrau, Gegeb, Renion, Kotta, Kottasau, and Kottaruido), collectively formed the rumah radja, the royal demesne directly governed by the raja. The remaining parts of the core, known as po, were each governed by a kapala, officials of comital character commonly identified by the territory they governed. When the government at Lewerang stopped functioning, the raja decided to move his residence from Lokea to Lanama and governed from there, additionally taking on the duties of the original kapala of Lewerang. The name Lewonama/Lanama was the old name for Larantuka.

The constituent princedoms were headed by hereditary rulers known as 'kakang', mentioned in local sources as raja-raja kecil (lit. 'petty kings') who maintained their own court; the polities under their rule functioned as vassal states, rendering tribute and providing troops when required. These princedoms, also referred to as kakangships, were as follows:

1. Hadung
2. Boleng
3. Lamalera
4. Horowura
5. Pamakayo
6. Lewolein
7. Wobo
8. Muda Kaputu
9. Lewingo
10. Lewotobi
11. Kiwangona
12. Lewoleba
13. Lewotala

The princedoms were further subdivided into political units known as negeri, each consisting of a mother-village and its dependent sister-villages. Horowura, for instance, was divided into eleven negeri, each consisting of the mother-village along with five additional villages. Horowura alone possessed an additional division known as the suku, a kin-based family unit absent from the other princedoms. The kakang of Hadung and Boleng held preeminence among their peers.

Each of the villages had for themselves a tuan tanah, lord of the land, as a spiritual representation of the raja.

== Legacy ==
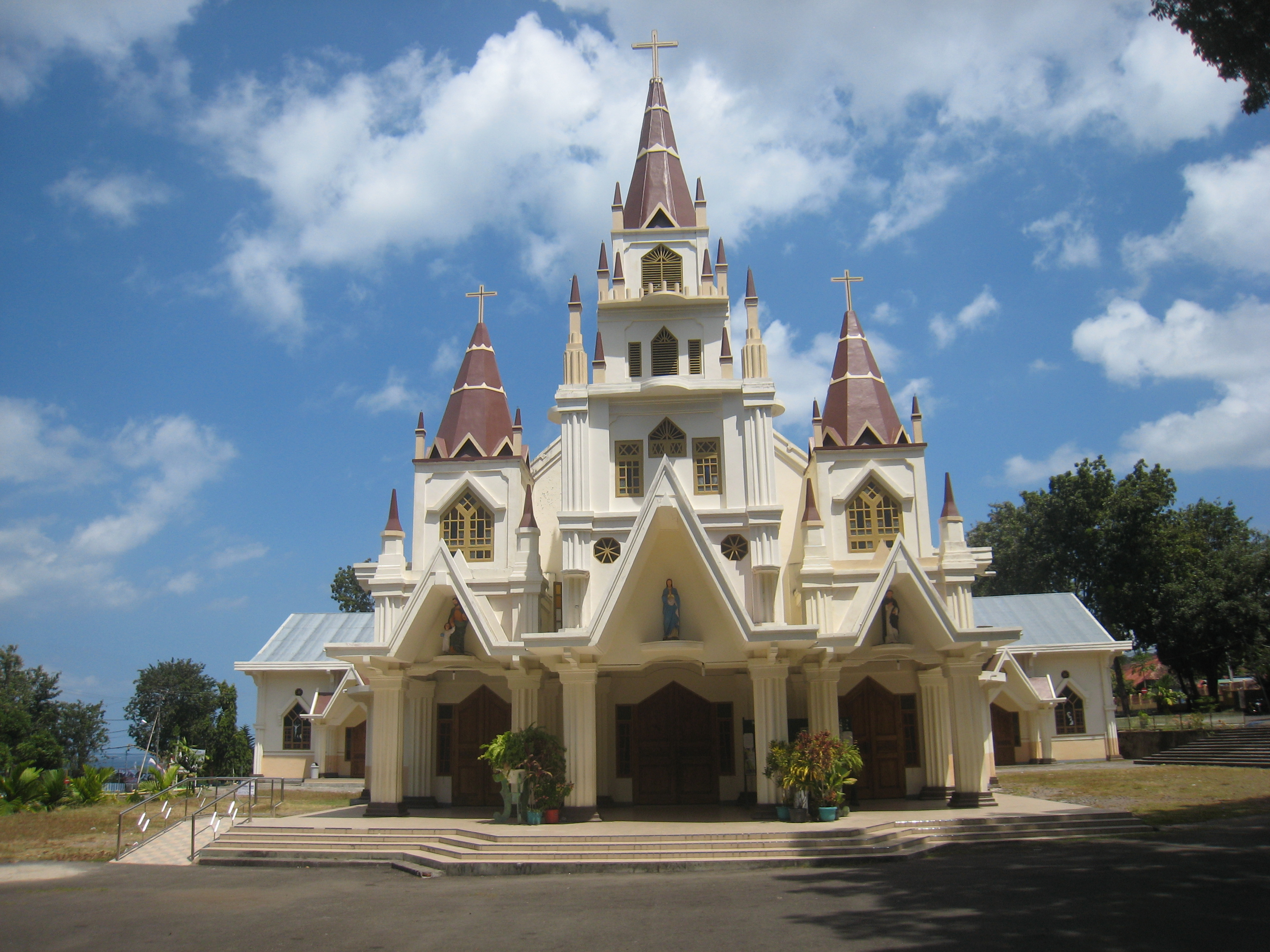
Cathedral of the Queen of the Rosary in Larantuka, built during the times of the kingdom.

In present-day Indonesia, unique Roman Catholic traditions close to Easter days remain, locally known as the Semana Santa. It involves a procession carrying statues of Jesus and Virgin Mary (locally referred to as Tuan Ana and Tuan Ma) to a local beach, then to Cathedral of the Queen of the Rosary, the seat of the bishop. The title of raja continues to be held by descendants of the former kings (most recently by Don Andre III Marthinus DVG in 2016) and, under Indonesian law, the Raja remains the recognized sovereign head of his keraton as a traditional cultural institution pursuant to Permendagri No. 39 of 2007. In addition, the Raja traditionally serves as Royal President of the Serikat Confreria Reinha Rosari; however, both the keraton and the confraternity are recognized today as cultural and religious institutions, and these roles do not entail secular or territorial authority. The residence (istana) of the king likewise survives to the present day, serving as a physical locus of the keraton and its continuing ceremonial functions.

According to the 2010 census, the majority of the population in the kingdom's former territories, and the East Nusa Tenggara province as a whole, remained Roman Catholics.

== See also ==
- Portuguese colonialism in Indonesia
- History of Christianity in Indonesia
- Christian kingdoms in Indonesia
- Christianity in Indonesia
- Kingdom of Sikka
