= Bantam Presidency =

Presidency of Company rule in India

- Presidency of Company rule in India
- 1617–1682
- Flag

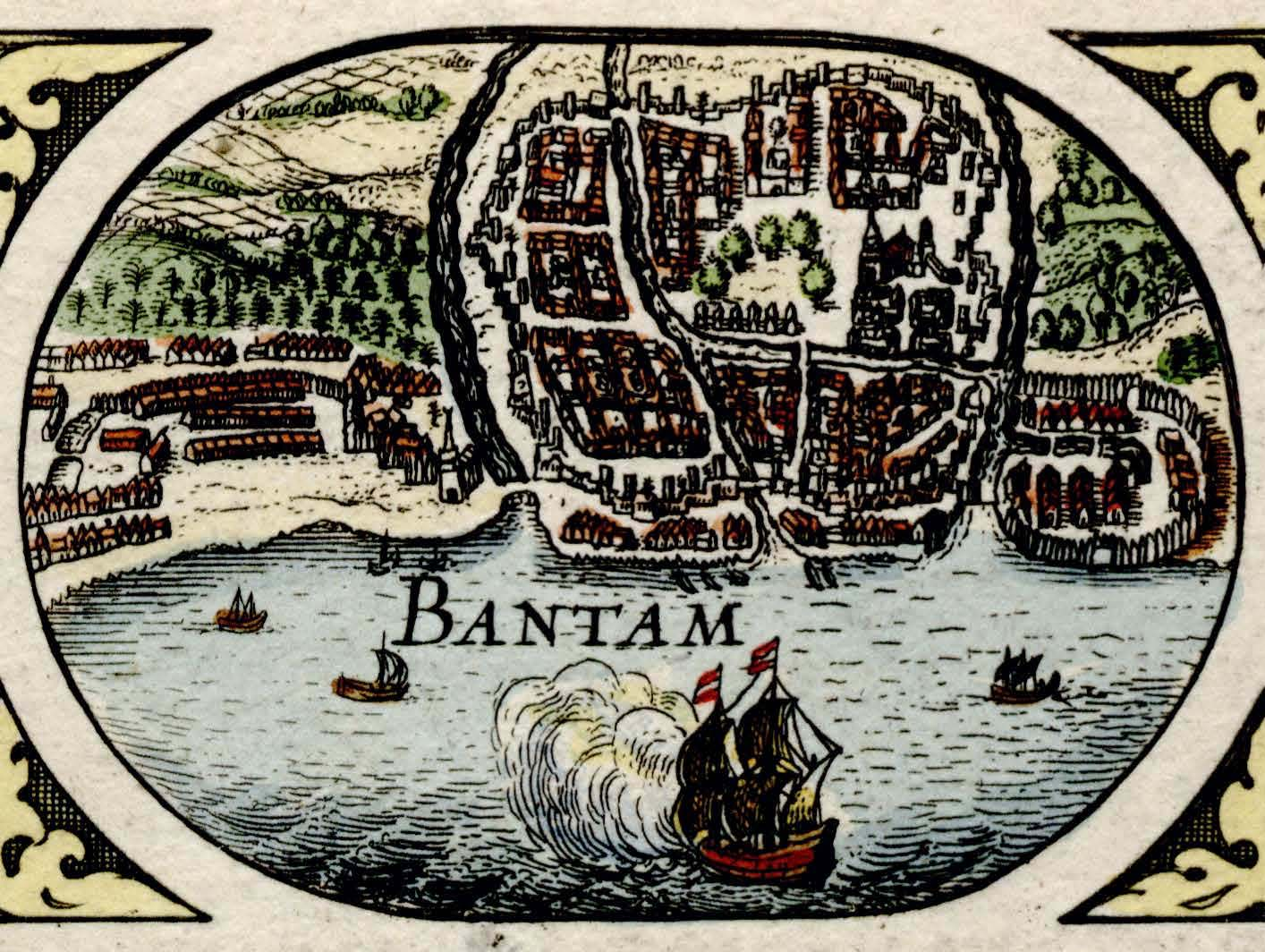
- Bantam in 1617
- History
  - Established: 1617
  - Disestablished: 1682
Preceded by
| Banten Sultanate |
Succeeded by
| Dutch |
| Saint George |
| Bencoolen |

Bantam Presidency was a presidency established by the British East India Company and based at the Company factory at Bantam in Java. Founded in 1617, the Presidency exercised its authority over all the Company factories in India, including the agencies of Madras, Masulipatnam and Surat. The factors at Bantam were instrumental in founding the colony of Madraspatnam in 1639 with the Fort St. George, which later grew into the modern city of Madras. The Presidency of Bantam was twice downgraded, first in 1630 before being restored in 1634 and for the second time in 1653, when owing to the hostility of Dutch traders, the Presidency was shifted to Madras.

Bantam remained an agency under the suzerainty of Madras and then Surat until Bantam was captured by the Dutch in 1682 and the English factory closed.

== Background ==
In December 1602, a fleet of East India Company ships commanded by James Lancaster reached Bantam and negotiated with the Sultan of Bantam over pepper trade and the opening of a settlement. A factory was eventually opened with eight factors headed by William Starkey as Governor and Thomas Morgan as his deputy. Bantam was one of the oldest possessions of the East India Company and older than all Indian colonies. But seven of the eight factors perished with Morgan in April 1603 and Starkey, himself, in June 1603. Starkey was succeeded as Governor by Edmund Scott.

When a second voyage commanded by Sir Henry Middleton reached Bantam, Scott had succeeded as Governor being the only member of the original expedition who was still alive. The early days of the colony were marred by death due to disease and Dutch hostilities. Scott was succeeded by John Saris who became the second Englishman after William Adams to set foot on Japan.

== Presidency ==
Upon successful negotiations with the Mughal Emperor Jahangir, the East India Company was permitted to conduct trade in India unmolested and opened factories at Masulipatnam (in 1610) and Surat (in 1612). But Bantam remained their principal possession though it was being rapidly eclipsed in importance by Surat whose position was further boosted by the English victory over the Portuguese at the Battle of Swally (1612 & 1614). Then in 1617, the position of Bantam was further enhanced when its Governor was designated President and given control of all English factories in South-East Asia and India, including Masulipatnam and Surat. Two years later, in 1619, the English signed a "Treaty of Defence" with the Dutch by which they agreed not to attack each other.

However, shortly after the conclusion of peace, hostilities again resumed and the then President of Bantam, Towerson was captured by the Dutch in February 1623 and executed. This was followed by a wholesale attack on all English settlements in South-East Asia. By 1624, the English were forced to vacate the East Indies, Malay peninsula and Siam. The Bantam factory was revived in 1629 but made subordinate to Surat. Bantam functioned as an agency subordinate to Surat till 1634-35 when the Presidency was restored.

In 1628, the English factors at Masulipatnam were forced to move to the factory of Armagaon which they had established in 1625-26 due to increased hostility of the Sultan of Golconda. The agency of Masulipatnam was restored in 1632, but the factory of Armagaon fell into decline due to bad climate. Forced to look for a better place to settle, factor Francis Day of Masulipatnam landed at the town of Madraspatnam in further south in the year 1639 and concluded an agreement with the Raja of Chandragiri to set up a factory. The following year, the Armagaon factory was moved to Madraspatnam and an agency was set up with Andrew Cogan as Agent. The Fort St. George was constructed in 1644.

== End of the English factory ==
With Anglo-Dutch relations worsening, the Bantam factory was finally vacated and the seat of the Presidency was moved to Madras in 1653. The factory was soon reestablished however.

In 1682, the factory was abruptly closed down for having taken the losing side in a civil war between the reigning sultan, passively backed by the English, and his rebellious son, who had asked for help from the Dutch. In March, the Dutch landed a considerable force from Batavia and placed the son on the throne, obtaining in exchange exclusive privilege to trade in his territories. On 1 April, a party of Dutch and native soldiers occupied the factory and the factor and the other English were forced to embark with their property on vessels which took them to Batavia, and thence to Surat in August the following year.

== Aftermath ==
Following the loss of Bantam, the Company established a fortified settlement at Bencoolen in Sumatra (Fort York) in 1687. Fort St George was raised to the rank of presidency in 1684, its Governor and Council having responsibility for the factories on the Coromandel coast and in the Bay of Bengal. In the same year, Bombay was nominated to replace Surat as the centre of the Company's activities in the west of India and the Persian Gulf.

== Agencies ==
When the Presidency of Bantam was formed in 1617, there were two agencies that were placed subordinate to the President of Bantam - the agency of Masulipatnam and the agency of Surat.

- Masulipatnam 1610 - 1629, 1634 - 1653
- Pattani 1610 - 1623
- Pettipollee
- Mocha 1618
- Jask 1619
- Macassar
- Acin
- Agra 1620
- Patna 1620
- Ormuz 1622
- Armagaon 1625 - 1653
- Thatta 1634

== List of governors of Bantam ==
- William Starkey 1602 - 1603
- Edmund Scott 1603 - 1605
- John Saris 1605 - 1609
- Augustine Spalding 1609
- Henworth 1609 -1610
- Edward Needles 1610
- Richard Woodies 1610 -1614
- John Jourdain 1614 - 1615
- George Berkeley 1615 - 1617

== List of presidents ==
- George Ball (March 1617 - September 1618)
- John Jackson 1618 - 1619
- John Powell 1619
- Gabriel Towerson 1619 - 1622
- George Willoughby 1624 - 1630
- George Willoughby 1632 - 1636
- Robert Coulson 1636 - 1639
- Aaron Baker 1639 - 1641
- Ralph Cartwright 1641 - 1646
- Aaron Baker 1646 - 1649
- Frederick Skinner 1649 - 1652
