= British Bencoolen =

Former British possession in Sumatra

Coordinates: 3.787093°S 102.251848°E

- Residency of British India
- 1685–1824
- Flag

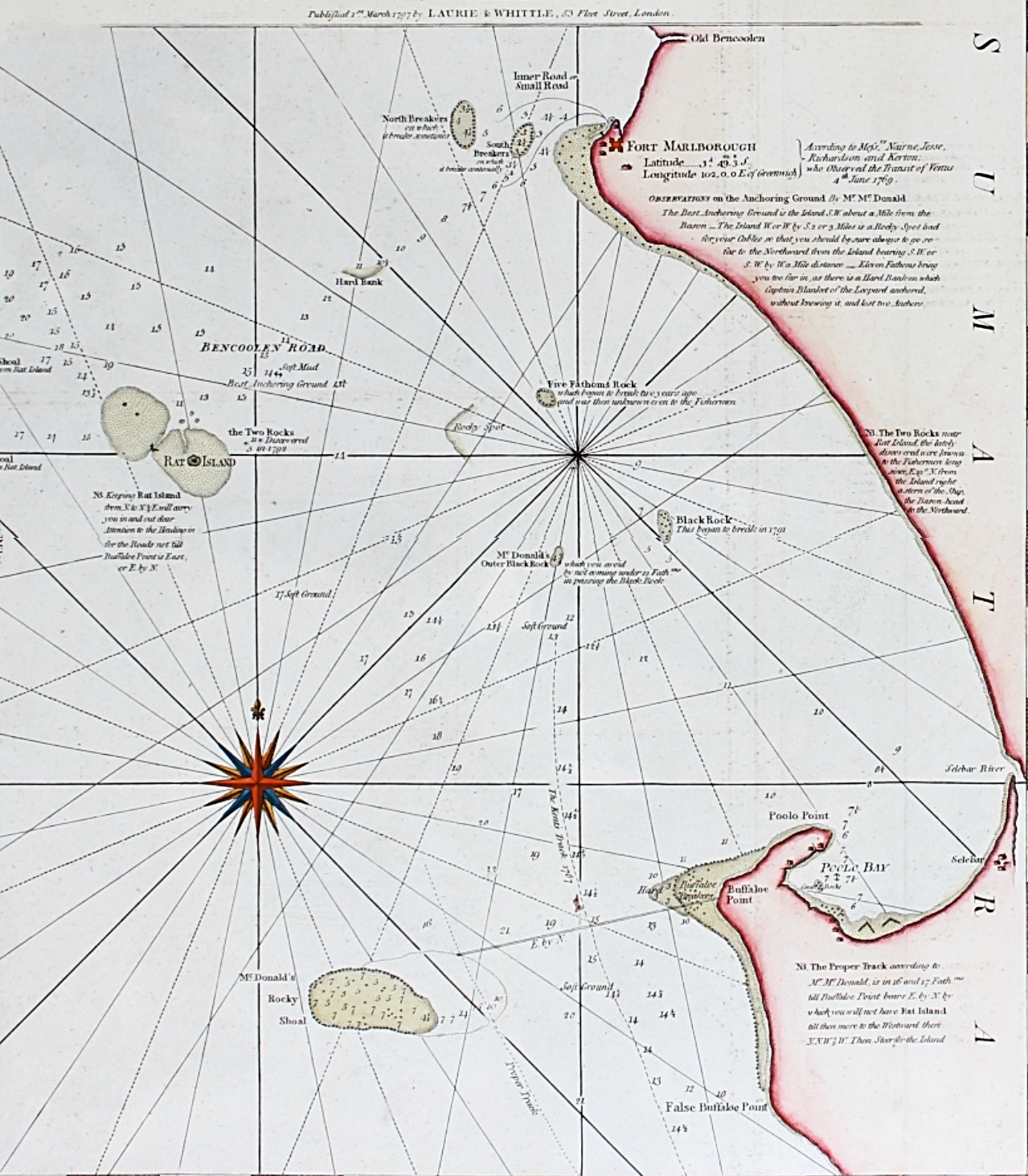
- Map of Bencoolen in 1797, Fort Marlborough can be seen on the top of the map.

Anthem
- "God Save the King/Queen"
- Capital: Fort Marlborough
- History
  - Established: 1685
  - Treaty of London 1824: 2 June 1824
| Preceded by | Succeeded by |
| Bantam; Ambon | Bencoolen |
- Today part of: Indonesia

British Bencoolen, variously known during its existence as Fort York, Fort Marlborough, Bencoolen, Benkulu, or "the West Coast", was a possession of the British East India Company (EIC) extending nearly 500 miles (800 km) along the southwestern coast of Sumatra and centered on the area of what is now Bengkulu City. The EIC established a presence there in 1685, and in 1714 it built Fort Marlborough there. The United Kingdom ceded Bencoolen to the Netherlands in 1824.

== Establishment and early development ==
It was a fatall and never enough to be repented error of our President and Council of Fort St. George [Madras] to break all our orders for a settlement at Pryaman upon a caprice of their owne to send our ships, spend our strength, our money and soe many men's lives upon settlement at such an unhealthful place as Bencoolen, because they hear there was more pepper there.

In 1683, following the forcible closing of their factory at Bantam in Java and under the likelihood of being turned out at any moment from Dutch-ruled Malacca, the directors of the East India Company found themselves facing the prospect of being entirely excluded from the spice trade of the Malay Archipelago. Unwilling to leave the lucrative pepper trade entirely in the hands of their Dutch rivals, they elected to build a fortified trading base at a safe distance from Batavia, center of Dutch power. Their first choice was Aceh at the northern tip of Sumatra, but the local sultan rejected their proposal. Then, representatives of Pryaman on the west coast of Sumatra said their town would welcome the Company. Instructions were therefore sent to the Governor of Madras to build at Pryaman a fort as strong as any in India.

Whether by accident or design, the plan miscarried and the expedition from Madras, commanded by Ralph Ord and Benjamin Bloome and consisting of two companies of 100 soldiers each, sailing past Pryaman, landed further south at Bencoolen in June 1685, and built a fort there near the mouth of Bencoolen River. Following the death of Ord, Benjamin Bloome, became the first deputy governor of "Fort York" under the authority of the governor of Madras. A smaller station was also built at Manduta. When they learned of these developments, the irate directors questioned the alleged superior merits of Bencoolen as a rich center of the pepper trade, stressing that the port was too close to Batavia and notoriously insalubrious. What had been done could not be undone however and Bencoolen began to live up to its reputation as a white man's graveyard. Deputy-governor Bloome was already lamenting in October 1685 that many of his men were dying from "fever and flux" and permission had to be granted to recruit non-European soldiers to supplement the military establishment of Fort York, a brick building of modest proportions built on the swampy seafront between a palisaded enclosure containing the Company's slaves, and a Malay village of seven or eight hundred houses.

The fort was meant to house the deputy governor and council, the factors, writers and assistants, as well as the garrison of European and "Bugis" troops, as native troops were called. Bantal, a sub-station 90 miles to the north, was also provided with a strong garrison and fifty cannons. In 1714 Fort York was replaced by Fort Marlborough, a larger stone fortress built on higher grounds two miles to the south. The object of the change being healthier conditions, more accommodation and better arrangement for defense. Deputy-Governor Joseph Collett (1712–1716) bragged that "this military structure of my own" was the strongest fortification in India. This did not prevent its capture and momentary occupation in 1719 by Malay insurgents who, among other grievances, opposed a deputy-governor's intention to levy a head tax. The new location did not improve the health situation as it had been hoped and the ill-repute of Bencoolen as an unhealthy station was to remain unaltered.

== Territory ==
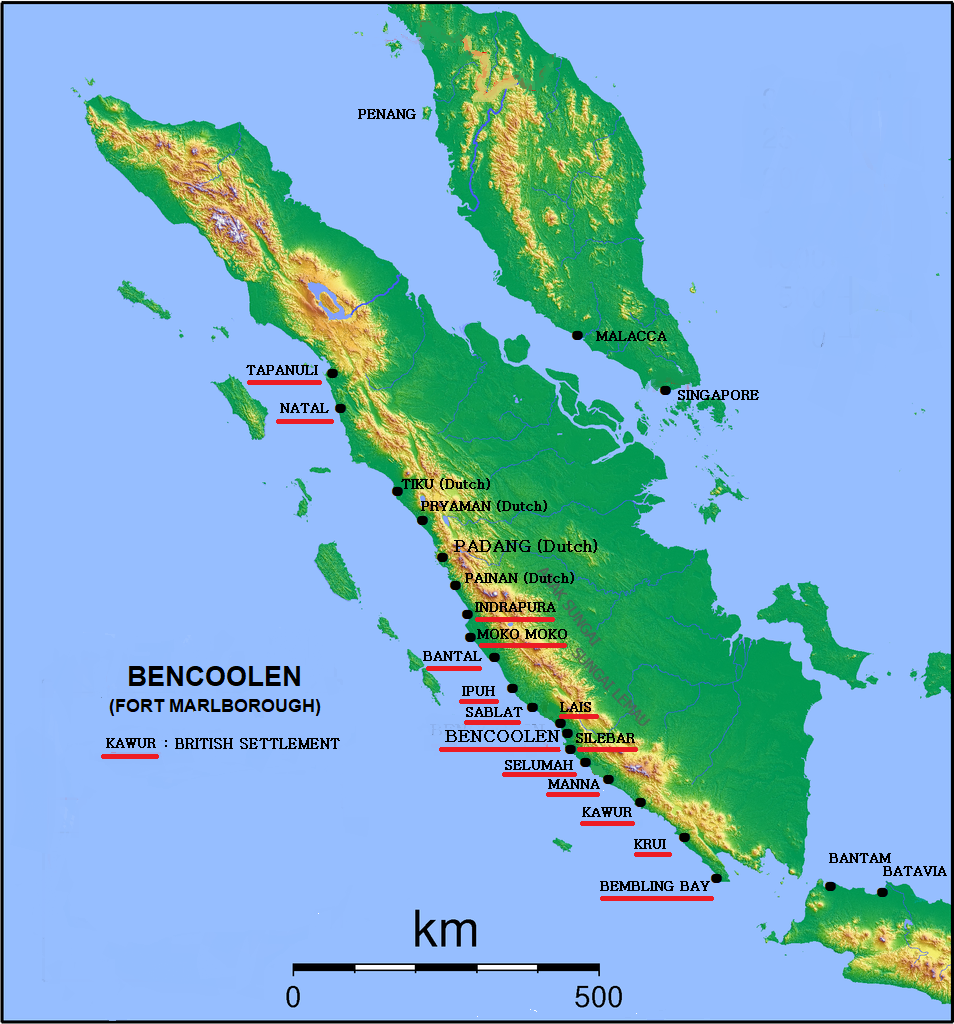
British Bencoolen

The area over which the East India Company was to dominate politically and economically for 140 years was the southwestern Sumatra pepper growing districts scattered along the narrow coastal plain tucked between the Indian Ocean and the Barisan mountain range covering the whole length of the island from north to south. Pepper was grown by small cultivators disseminated along the river valleys of that coastal strip.

Although the Bencoolen-Silebar region had long been the main pepper outlet of southwestern Sumatra, its annual volume was far from meeting EIC requirements and the Company soon began setting up subordinate factories, generally called settlements or residencies, along 500 km of coast both north and south of Bencoolen. Local cultivators would bring and sell their pepper to the nearest EIC settlement, which would then be shipped by Company sloops to Bencoolen. This system was costly to maintain and it was one of the reasons why British Bencoolen generally registered an annual deficit.

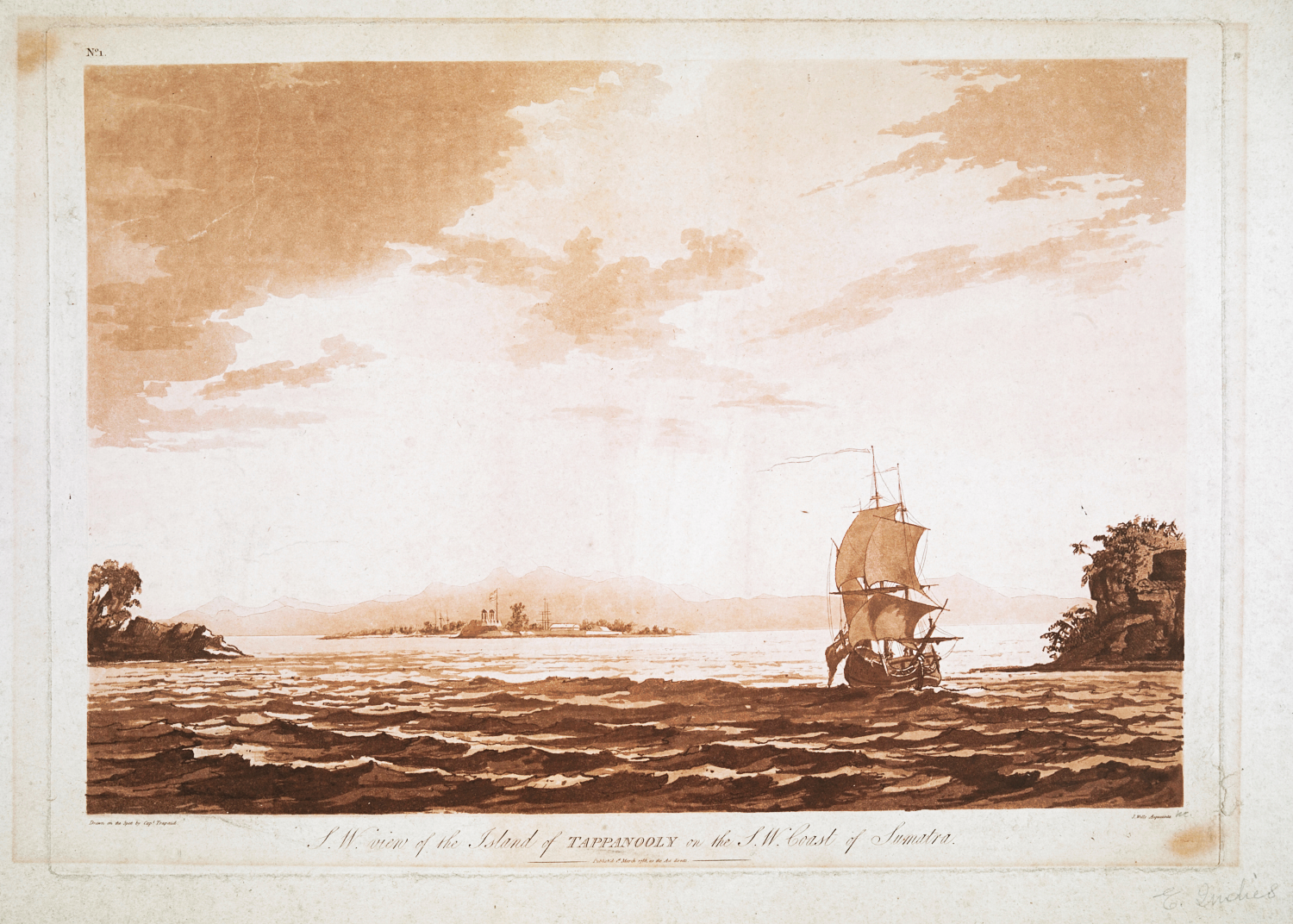
1788 aquatint showing an East India Company vessel entering Tapanuli Bay

Until the middle of the 18th century, all the EIC settlements were set up in southwestern Sumatra, from Indrapura in the north to Krui in the south, but in 1752, in response to an invitation from the inhabitants of Natal in northwestern Sumatra, the deputy governor and council at Fort Marlborough sent agents to take possession of the port despite protests by the Dutch who considered Natal to be in their sphere of influence. A few years later, fearing that the Dutch were contemplating making themselves master of the vast Bay of Tapanuli 100 km north of Natal, the EIC forestalled them by establishing a settlement there. Natal and Tapanuli were to be the only EIC settlements not located in the pepper districts of the south and not trading primarily in pepper.

Originally a Presidency within British India, in 1785 Bencoolen was downgraded to Bencoolen Residency and placed under the Bengal Presidency.

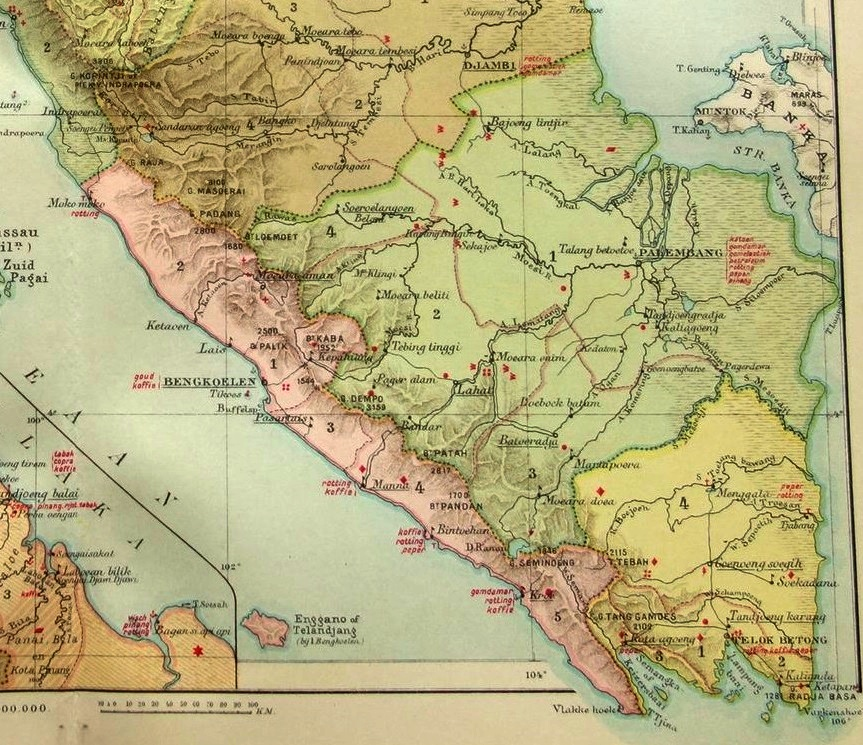
The Dutch East India Residency of Bengkoelen (in pink on a map from 1910) comprised the area formerly covered by British Bencoolen.

In October 1817, Stamford Raffles was appointed lieutenant-governor of Bencoolen. During his time as lieutenant-governor of what he declared to be "the most wretched place I ever beheld", he abolished slavery and founded Singapore in order to provide a new trading port in the region.

In 1823, Singapore was removed from the control of Bencoolen. The British ceded Bencoolen to the Netherlands in the Anglo-Dutch Treaty of 1824.
