= Tan Che Sang =

Singaporean businessman (1763–1835)

Tan Sang (simplified Chinese: 陈送; traditional Chinese: 陳送; pinyin: Chén Sòng; 1763 — 2 April 1835), better known as Tan Che Sang (Chinese: 陳叔送), was a pioneering merchant in Singapore.

== Early life ==
It's generally believed that Tan was born in the Minnan region of Fujian in 1763 to a Hoklo family. Historian Hsu Yun Tsiao placed his hometown as most likely Zhangzhou or Quanzhou. Earlier accounts identified him as Cantonese and his birthplace as Guangzhou, which author Richard Edward Hale attributes to a misread document that spells Tan's place of origin as "Guanzhou". It's also established that Tan was a Southern Min speaker and involved in the Hokkien community, with Hale further noting that the surname Tan is spelled Chan in Cantonese. Hsu proposed that Tan's proper name was Tan Sang (alternately romanized as Ch'en Sung) and "Che" simply a title of respect meaning "uncle" (叔) in Southern Min.

== Career ==
Tan, aged 15, left Fujian in 1778 and went to Riau. He then moved to Penang, where he stayed for 10 years, after which he left for Malacca, where he first met William Farquhar.

In 1819, Tan and several merchants left for the newly established settlement on the island of Singapore. When Tan arrived, he purchased a warehouse on High Street from Farquhar, who was the Resident of Singapore, and became an agent for Chinese junks. He later moved his warehouse to Commercial Square. Tan also acquired several sites near the square for his business. He encouraged Chinese immigration by offering to stand surety for newcomers who wished to obtain goods on credit. According to Sir Song Ong Siang, it was said that Tan "used to boast that he wielded so much influence over the Chinese section that any day he said the word he could empty the place of all the Europeans." According to historian Yen Ching-hwang, he was "probably powerful in the underworld".

== Personal life and death ==
Tan was reputed to have been a miser and a gambler. He was alleged to have unsuccessfully attempted to curb his gambling addiction by cutting off the first joint of one of his little fingers. Historian Constance Mary Turnbull wrote that Tan "had no social contact with the ruling community, and was a strange, withdrawn man, an inveterate gambler obsessed with making money, and reputed to sleep with his money chests in his bedroom." He built a house in Kampong Glam, which he sold to a Mr. Ker. The house was later sold to Christian Baumgarten.

Tan died on 2 April 1835. His funeral, which was attended by somewhere around 10,000 to 15,000 people, was held on 13 April. Following his death, several of his descendants were embroiled in major lawsuits over his legacy. He was the first Chinese person mentioned in Charles Burton Buckley's An Anecdotal History of Old Times in Singapore.
