= The Singapore Chronicle =

Newspaper (1824 to 1837)

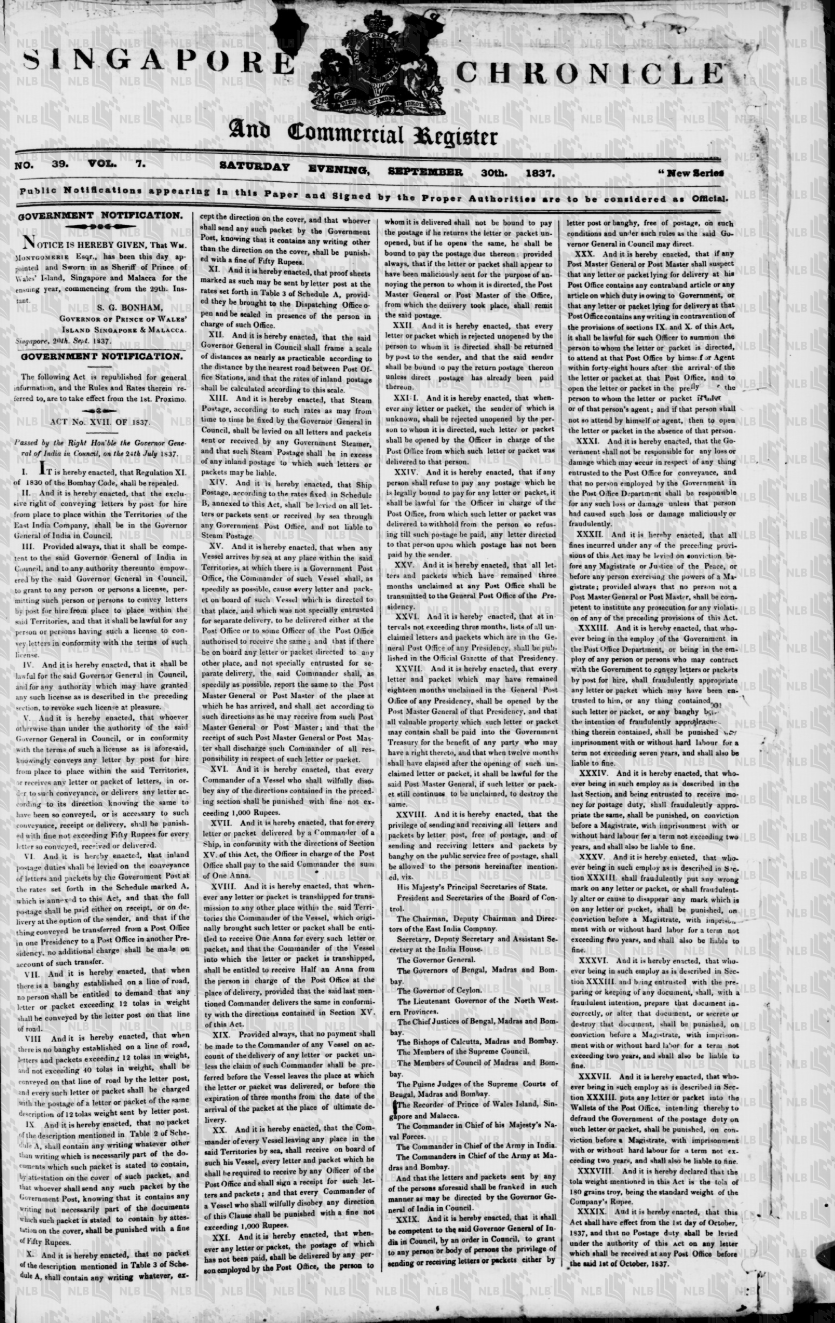
- The final issue of The Singapore Chronicle on 30 September 1837
- Type: Daily newspaper
- Format: Broadsheet
- Founder(s): John Crawfurd; Francis James Bernard
- Founded: 1 January 1824; 202 years ago
- Ceased publication: 30 September 1837; 188 years ago
- Language: English
- Headquarters: Singapore

The Singapore Chronicle, initially titled the Singapore Chronicle or Commercial Register, was a Singaporean English-language newspaper and the first of its kind to be published in Singapore. Its inaugural issue was released on 1 January 1824, with Francis James Bernard serving as the founding editor. A key contributor in its formative years was John Crawfurd, the 2nd Resident of Singapore, who played a significant role in shaping the paper's editorial content and political commentary. The newspaper featured a mix of commercial news, shipping reports and government notices, serving as an important channel of communication in the growing colonial settlement.

For more than a decade, the Singapore Chronicle remained the only newspaper in the settlement, holding a monopoly on printed news and information. However, this dominance ended with the establishment of The Singapore Free Press in 1835, which provided a fresher editorial voice and broader appeal. Struggling to keep up with the competition and changing reader expectations, the Singapore Chronicle experienced a decline in readership and influence, ceasing publication in 1837.

== History ==
=== Founding ===
On 15 July 1823, John Crawfurd, who had been appointed the Resident of Singapore in May following the dismissal of William Farquhar, submitted an application for the establishment of a newspaper on behalf of Francis James Bernard. At the time, Bernard was serving as the head of the local police department. The proposed publication was to be both published and edited by Bernard, with Crawfurd acting as its supporter and official intermediary in dealings with the colonial administration.

The newspaper was intended to remain "entirely under the control of the local authority", reflecting the colonials desire to monitor and influence public communication within the new settlement. Its stated purpose was to provide "useful intelligence to foreign merchants rather than to the Settlers of the Colony itself", underscoring the colonials' focus on commerce and trade. This reflected the priorities of early Singapore as a trading post under British administration, where newspapers functioned not only as news sources but also as instruments of colonial governance.

=== Peak ===
Work on the first issue of the Singapore Chronicle or Commercial Register began in December and it was published on 1 January 1824. The newspaper was printed at the Mission Press of the London Missionary Society. On 9 February, Bernard resigned as publisher and editor over a quarrel with Crawfurd, who served as the newspaper's principal contributor in its first two years. The newspaper had reprinted content from the Prince of Wales Island Gazette on the farewell of William Farquhar, with statements from the Indian and Bugis communities expressing their hope for his return. Crawfurd accused Bernard of having deceived him as the latter had "assured Crawfurd that the addresses contained nothing political." He attempted to withdraw the resignation at least twice though Crawfurd refused to accept his withdrawal. According to historian Carl Alexander Gibson-Hill, Crawfurd was "pleased to see him go", suggesting that he might have "engineered the quarrel, in front of witnesses, in order to get rid of Bernard without dismissing him." William Campbell succeeded Bernard as editor in March 1824 and sent an application seeking permission to publish a newspaper "similar published at this place, but which is now discontinued", which was accepted by Crawfurd as Resident on the same day. The first issue edited by Campbell was published on 1 April. Under him, the newspaper, renamed The Singapore Chronicle, was published fortnightly.

In May 1826, as the colony's trade "flourished", Campbell made an application seeking permission to establish a separate, complementary weekly single-sheet paper focusing on commercial matters. The paper, to be known as The Commercial Register and Advertiser, would be published every Saturday and contain a list of imports and exports, a price list, current prices of foreign markets, advertisements and shipping information. It cost half a Spanish dollar a month to subscribers of the Chronicle and 25 cents an issue to those without a subscription. George Bonham, acting as Resident in place of Crawfurd, "immediately" approved the application.

In early December 1826, Campbell announced that he would soon be departing from Singapore. He made an application seeking to transfer editorship and proprietorship to James Loch, who had arrived in Singapore in the same month. The transfer was approved by the Penang Council on 23 December. Loch was critical of both the government and of press control and the newspaper began publishing articles that were critical of the local government. This led to the local government re-imposing the Gagging Act on the paper, which required each issue to be vetted by the Resident Councillor, then John Prince, before publication. However, Loch became "fairly subdued" in later issues.

On 30 March 1829, Loch sold both The Singapore Chronicle and The Commercial Register and Advertiser to William Renshaw George, who had come to the settlement "without a license to settle and seemingly with little or no capital" on 19 February. Permission to transfer proprietorship and editorship to George was granted by the Penang Council on 24 April. Under George, there was "little change in the police of the papers" from Loch's tenure as editor, although he "promised more attention to local affairs, especially commercial matters, without a serious loss on the reporting of important events from India and Europe." In early 1830, John Henry Moor succeeded George as editor of both the Chronicle and The Commercial Register and Advertiser, though George remained in charge of the commercial notes. According to Gibson-Hil, Moor "brought a new vigour to the editorial side of the paper". He also established his own press, with which he printed the newspaper beginning in September 1930. This eventually allowed for the newspaper to be published weekly.

At the end of 1830, George merged The Singapore Chronicle with The Commercial Register and Advertiser as The Singapore Chronicle and Commercial Register. The first issue was published on 6 January 1831. A subscription then cost $18 a month or $4.5 a quarter, with individual issues costing 50 cents. From 1831 to 1835, save for the Prince of Wales Island Gazette which was "not a serious competitor", the Chronicle and Commercial Register was the only newspaper in the Straits Settlements following the closures of its other competitors, such as the Malacca Observer, the Pinang Register & Miscellany and the Government Gazette of Prince of Wales's Island, Singapore and Malacca. The Gagging Act was lifted on 28 March 1833, freeing the newspaper from censorship.

=== Decline ===
In September 1835, George sold the newspaper, which was then a "flourishing concern", to local merchant Walter Scott Lorrain, who in turn sold the newspaper to Penang-born merchant James Fairlie Carnegy, though Lorrain continued to serve as editor after the sale. Gibson-Hill stated that it is "clear" that Carnegy's arrival in Singapore was "not a welcome advent to at least a section of the local business community." In response to the sale, The Singapore Free Press was established in October. Moor had resigned as editor of the Chronicle and become the editor of the Free Press. To compete with the newly established paper, the subscription rates were lowered to $12 a year, 50 cents for each issue for subscribers and 25 cents for each issue for non-subscribers. According to Gibson-Hill, the Chronicle continued to decline in quality whereas the Free Press continued to improve, which led to advertisers choosing the latter, in spite of its higher rates. The final issue of the Chronicle was published on 30 September 1837.

== Contents ==
In his application seeking permission for the founding of the newspaper, Crawfurd claimed that it was to remain "exclusively commercial" and every issue was to contain a price list, announcements of arrivals and departures and commercial news from elsewhere in the region, while "essays on particular commercial articles or subjects" would "occasionally" be included. Issues of the newspaper also included advertisements, editorial notes on local topics and events and pieces written by correspondents. Announcements of births, deaths and marriages were "printed only at the request of interested people." With Crawfurd serving as the main contributor in its first two years, the newspaper served as a "semi-official gazette". Gibson-Hill described Crawfurd as the "editor in effect if not in name." From April 1824 onwards, each issue was four quarto pages-long with "three columns of type", printed on a "single sheet of rough, Chinese-made paper" folded once. All government notices were included in the newspaper. For this, the government initially afforded the editor a regular, fixed monthly subsidy of 60 Spanish dollars. However, this ceased in 1829 for financial reasons.

The newspaper later began republishing content from various other newspapers such as the Prince of Wales Island Gazette and the Malacca Observer. Under George, an extra half-sheet was added to the newspaper and its length was extended to five to six pages. It was occasionally further extended to seven or more pages under the editorship of Moore, who ensured that the newspaper's length "seldom dropped below 5½-6 pages." Following the merger of The Singapore Chronicle with The Commercial Register and Advertiser, the page size was doubled and its length was reduced to four pages, with the first three comprising four columns of type. The last sheet was titled Commercial Register and was also sold separately for 25 cents. This was renamed the Singapore Chronicle Price Current in 1835 and its price was reduced to 10 cents a copy.

== See also ==
- List of newspapers in Singapore
