= John Henry Moor =

Singaporean newspaperman (1802–1843)

John Henry Moor (29 December 1802 – 1 May 1843) was a newspaperman who founded and edited the Malacca Observer and later served as the editor of The Singapore Chronicle and then as the founding editor of The Singapore Free Press. He was also the compiler of Notices of the Indian Archipelago, and Adjacent Countries and the founding headmaster of the Singapore Free School, which eventually became Raffles Institution.

== Early life and education ==
Moor was born in Macau on 29 December 1802. He was taken to Ireland in his youth and eventually began studying at the Trinity College Dublin to "[qualify] himself for taking orders". However, a "speech impediment" forced him to "abandon this intention." He then began an apprentice to a "respectable" bookseller in Dublin, though he "preferred" Asia. He came to Chennai, then known as Madras, "on chance".

== Career ==
=== Malacca (1826 – 1829) ===
After spending a few years in Madras, Moor came to Malacca in 1826. Shortly after arriving, he received a license and a government subsidy of 50 rupees to publish and serve as the editor of a newspaper, which he called The Malacca Observer, in return for space in the newspaper which the government could use for announcements. Copies of the newspaper were also to be delivered to Samuel Garling, then the Resident Councillor of Malacca. The newspaper was printed by the Anglo-Chinese Press and its first issue was published in September. As editor, Moor wrote "bitterly" on the subject of the continued existence of slavery in Malacca, which he found to be "abhorrent".

In an issue which was to be published in October, Moor made an "ill-informed" comment on the situation in Naning. In this period, all newspapers in the Straits Settlements were heavily censored and Garling was required to approve each issue before publication. However, Garling had mistakenly believed that it was no longer within his power to censor the paper if the government did not pay for it and so when the government subsidies for The Malacca Observer ceased in 1829 he believed that he was not able to force Moor to censor the newspaper's contents. As such, when he had received the proofs of the issue, he merely wrote to Moor, informing him that he was incorrect. However, Moor instead published the paragraph containing the error unedited, prompting Garling to write to him again. Moor then published Garling's letter in the newspaper and then doubled down, insisting that he was correct. When, Robert Fullerton, then the Governor of the Straits Settlements, heard of the contents of the newspaper, he instead came to the conclusion that Moor must have either had or believed to have had Garling's support. He came to Malacca in that month and insisted that the Anglo-Chinese Press cease the printing of The Malacca Observer.

=== Singapore (1829 – 1843) ===
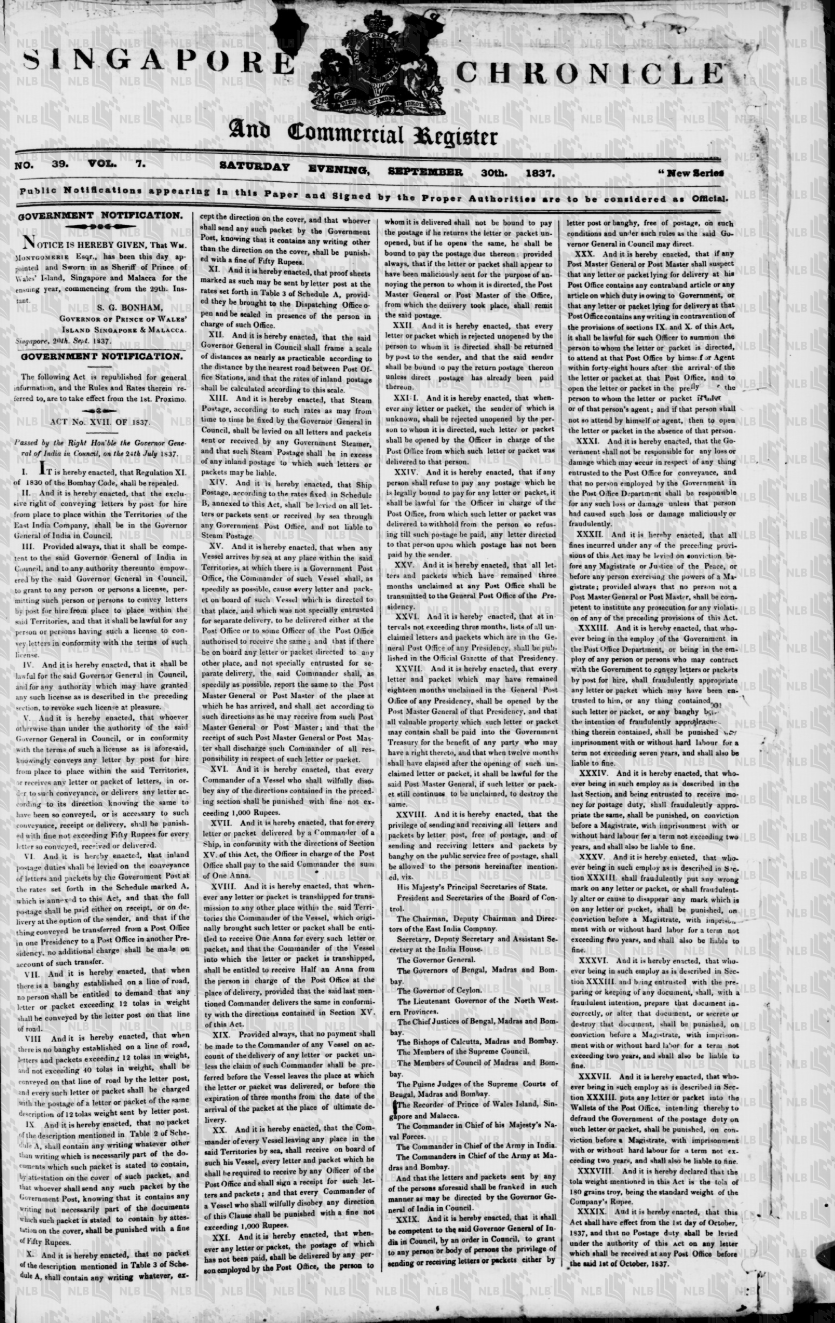
The final issue of the Singapore Chronicle and Commercial Register

Moor came to Singapore after publication of The Malacca Observer ceased. In early 1930, he succeeded William Renshaw George as the editor of both The Singapore Chronicle, the first and then only newspaper on the island, and its complementary weekly, The Commercial Register and Advertiser, though George remained its owner and in charge of the paper's commercial notes. This was not officially announced and according to Carl Alexander Gibson-Hill, "does not seem to have been referred to the Governor in Council for his approval!" Gibson-Hill argued that Moor "brought a new vigour to the editorial side of the paper". Under his editorship, the paper's length remained near consistently beyond five pages and occasionally reached seven pages. The Singapore Chronicle became a weekly and George made the decision to merge The Singapore Chronicle and The Commercial Register and Advertiser, with the newly merged newspaper bearing the name The Singapore Chronicle or Commercial Register. By 1831, The Singapore Chronicle or Commercial Register was the only newspaper published in the Straits Settlements, with all of its former competitors having ceased publication.

In September 1835, George sold the paper to merchant Walter Scott Lorrain, who in turn sold it to James Fairlie Carnegy. According to Gibson-Hill, Carnegy's arrival was "not a welcome advent to at least a section of the local business community." Moor resigned as editor shortly after the sale and became the founding editor of The Singapore Free Press & Mercantile Advertiser, which had been established in response to the sale to Carnegy. He was succeeded as the editor of The Singapore Chronicle by Lorrain. Moor continued to contribute to the Free Press until his death in 1843. However, he was not the editor of the newspaper at his death and it is not known who his successor in this position was, though William Napier was the editor by the early 1840s.

Moor was appointed the headmaster of the Singapore Free School, now known as the Raffles Institution, on its opening on 1 August 1834. He continued to serve in this role until his death. In 1835, Moor announced that he would be compiling Notices of the Indian Archipelago, and Adjacent Countries: Being a Collection of Papers Relating to Borneo, Celebes, Bali, Java, Sumatra, Nias, the Philippine islands, Sulus, Siam, Cochin China, Malayan Peninsula, etc., a "massive compendium" which was to be published in two volumes. The first would carry articles published in The Singapore Chronicle while the second was to feature articles on "key topics" both in Singapore and throughout the region. However, printers and paper were then in short supply in Singapore and the arrangement of the book's contents was by his own admission "wanting". The first volume took two years to complete and was published in December 1837, becoming one of the earliest books to be published in Singapore. However, sales were lacklustre and Moor reportedly incurred "such heavy losses" on the project that he was unable to compile the second volume. The work has since "claimed its place in history as a valuable record of Singapore’s early years".

== Death and family ==
Moor died on 1 May 1843. On his death, he was survived by his wife, Christina Elisabeth Stretcher and a "large" family. He left "little else in the way of material property, apart from a stock of unsold copies of his book" and a public subscription fund was established for his family. This raised $6,700, which was invested in three mortgaged houses in Singapore, which provided his widow with an allowance. A house at Raffles Institution is named for him. One of Moor's daughters, Elisabeth Antoinette Moor, married Alfred George Farquhar Bernard, the eldest son of Francis James Bernard, the founding editor of the Chronicle, and a grandson of William Farquhar. Justin Trudeau, the 23rd Prime Minister of Canada, and his mother, activist Margaret Trudeau, are descendants of Moor through Elisabeth.
