= Hengyi Industries =

Brunei petrochemical refinery

Hengyi Industries Sendirian Berhad
- Type: Joint venture
- Industry: Petrochemical, Oil refinery
- Founded: 2011; 15 years ago
- Headquarters: Pulau Muara Besar, Brunei
- Key people: Qiu Jianlin (Chairman); Chen Lian Cai (CEO)
- Products: Gasoline, Diesel, Jet fuel, Paraxylene, Benzene, LPG, Polypropylene, Polyethylene
- Revenue: RMB 40.47 billion (US$5.63 billion) (2025)
- Owner: Zhejiang Hengyi Group (70%); Damai Holdings (30%)
- Website: www.hengyi-industries.com

Hengyi Industries Sendirian Berhad is an integrated petrochemical complex and oil refinery joint venture based in Brunei. It is a partnership between China’s Zhejiang Hengyi Group (70%) and Damai Holdings (30%), a subsidiary of the Brunei government's Strategic Development Capital Fund. As of 2026, it represents the largest Foreign Direct Investment (FDI) in Brunei's history and serves as a primary pillar of Wawasan Brunei 2035, the national vision for economic diversification.

== History ==
=== Formation and Planning (2011–2016) ===
In 2011, the Brunei Economic Development Board (BEDB) signed a Memorandum of Understanding with the Zhejiang Hengyi Group to develop a refinery and aromatics plant. The project was designed to address Brunei's long-term need to reduce its reliance on raw oil and gas exports. The site selected was Pulau Muara Besar (PMB), an island in the Brunei Bay that offered deep-water berthing for Very Large Crude Carriers (VLCCs).

Between 2013 and 2017, the Brunei government invested in critical infrastructure, including the 2.7 km Pulau Muara Besar Bridge, a US$204 million project completed by China Harbour Engineering Company in 2018 to link the island to the mainland.

=== Phase 1 Launch and Operations (2017–2021) ===
Construction on Phase 1 began in early 2017 with an investment of US$3.445 billion. The facility reached full commercial operation in November 2019, with a refining capacity of 175,000 barrels per day. The project achieved a major milestone by providing 100% of Brunei's domestic fuel requirements, previously met by imports and a smaller refinery in Seria.

== Phase 2 Expansion (2026–2028) ==
In January 2026, Hengyi Petrochemical officially announced the full launch of its Phase 2 expansion project after securing a US$13.6 billion investment package, including financing from the Brunei Islamic Bank and tax incentive certificates from the Brunei government.

The expansion is scheduled for completion by late 2028 and aims to increase the complex's total refining capacity to 20 million tonnes per year (approximately 400,000 barrels per day). Key components of the 2026 expansion include:

- New Units: Installation of a 1.65 million tonne per year naphtha cracker and dedicated units for polyethylene (PE) and polypropylene (PP).
- Diversification: Introduction of Brunei's first polymer production plants, moving the country into the high-value plastics manufacturing sector.
- Downstream Integration: Expansion of purified terephthalic acid (PTA) and polyethylene terephthalate (PET) production lines.

== Operations and Products ==
Hengyi Industries utilizes an integrated refinery-petrochemical model to maximize value from crude oil.

=== Production Capacities (Current and Planned) ===
Product	Phase 1 Capacity (Annual)	Phase 2 Target (Annual)
Refining Capacity	8 million tonnes	20 million tonnes
Paraxylene (PX)	1.5 million tonnes	3.5 million tonnes
Benzene	500,000 tonnes	1.3 million tonnes
Polypropylene	N/A	1.0 million tonnes
Polyethylene	N/A	1.05 million tonnes

=== Logistics and Infrastructure ===
The Pulau Muara Besar site is a self-sustaining industrial park featuring:

- A 24-hour dedicated power plant and water desalination facility.
- A deep-water jetty capable of handling 300,000-tonne oil tankers.
- **Hengyi Industries International Pte Ltd (HII):** Based in Singapore, this commercial arm handles the global sourcing of raw materials and the marketing of refined products.

== Impact and Sustainability ==
=== Workforce Development ===
The company has emphasized "Bruneianization" through various educational programs:

- Joint Scholarship: Since 2014, Hengyi has partnered with Universiti Brunei Darussalam (UBD) and Zhejiang University (ZJU) to provide fully-funded chemical engineering degrees. As of 2025, over 200 students have participated, with 135 already employed full-time at the plant.
- Vocational Training: Collaboration with the Institute of Brunei Technical Education (IBTE) to train refinery operators and maintenance staff.

=== Environmental Initiatives ===
- Project SINAR: Launched in 2024, this project involves installing 36 hectares of solar panels on Pulau Muara Besar to offset the refinery's carbon emissions and support Brunei's national renewable energy targets.
- Reforestation: The company has a long-term pledge to plant 200 hectares of trees in Brunei. By late 2025, it completed its 7th reforestation project in collaboration with Bank Islam Brunei Darussalam (BIBD).
