= An Anecdotal History of Old Times in Singapore =

1902 book by Charles Burton Buckley

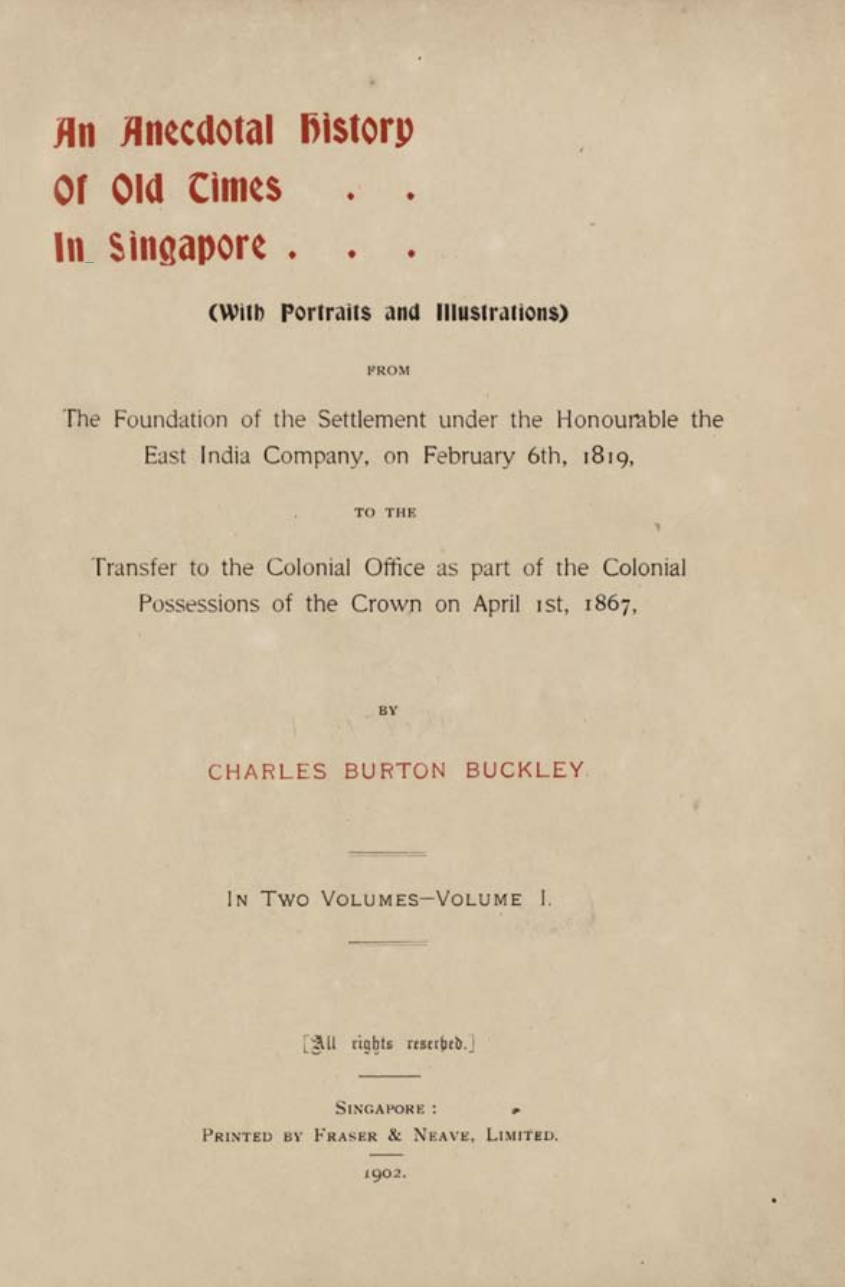
The title page of the first volume of An Anecdotal History of Old Times in Singapore

An Anecdotal History of Old times in Singapore: (With Portraits and Illustrations) from the Foundation of the Settlement Under the Honourable the East India Company, on February 6, 1819, to the Transfer of the Colonial Office as Part of the Colonial Possessions of the Crown on April 1, 1867 is a 1902 book written by Charles Burton Buckley. Published in two volumes by Fraser and Neave, it is a history of Singapore from its establishment as a British trading post in 1819 to 1867, when it became a territory of the Straits Settlements. It has since been criticised for its unreliability.

== Contents ==
The book is chronologically arranged into 57 chapters and around 400 pages per volume. It includes a preface in which Buckley wrote: "It is unnecessary to say that it is only a compilation, but trouble has not been spared to make it as correct as the existing means of knowledge would allow." Some chapters are devoted to "various institutions and places", such as the Raffles Institution, the Catholic Church in Singapore and the Hosburgh and Raffles lighthouses. It features details such as "names, dates, places and various events", as well as "costs, subscriptions and so on." A 22-page index can be found at the end of the second volume.

The book is "not so much a serious academic work but a collection of Buckley’s lighthearted columns aimed at entertaining the local reading public."

== History ==
The book was published on 9 February 1903, in time for the 84th anniversary of Raffles's landing on the island. Buckley had written the book based on articles from The Singapore Free Press, which he had revived in 1884, various books, documents and pamphlets, as well as his own experiences and personal accounts from his acquaintances, such as William Henry Macleod Read and James Guthrie Davidson. Another source of Buckley's were the notes of Thomas Braddell, who had been gathering information for a history of the Straits Settlements which he never completed. In 1965, an edition was published by the University of Malaya. It was printed in Hong Kong, which was "a change from Japanese productions." The book was again reprinted in 1984. This edition was published by the Oxford University Press and included an introduction by Constance Mary Turnbull which notes that Buckley was "not a careful scholar". The work was reprinted by General Books LLC in Memphis, Tennessee in 2012.

== Reception ==
The book was well-received by contemporary critics. The Evening Standard proclaimed that it would be "of considerable interest" to "all who have, or have had, any connection with that British Possession". The Imperial and Asiatic Quarterly Review opined that Buckley "with great patience and labour has done his work well, and merits the highest commendation from the public." The Academy and Literature called it "packed with valuable and suggestive matter for the observant eye."

An Anecdotal History has retrospectively been criticised for its numerous inaccuracies. In a 1954 review of the work, Carl Alexander Gibson-Hill, the curator of the Raffles Museum in Singapore, panned it for its errors, writing that Buckley "did not verify his references; he did not read his sources properly; he did not even read his own book properly." Gibson-Hill stated that Buckley "nowhere defines his sources explicitely [sic?], and he seldom indicates his authority for any particular passage or statement." He raised several examples of sources that would have been available to Buckley that the latter had not used and claimed that Buckley "did not make the best use of the early Singapore newspapers", failing to take into account the paper's potential biases. Gibson-Hill also noted various factual inaccuracies, which, according to him, "might be considered of small account, but they occur far too frequently for one to be able to put any trust in the book on matters of detail." He opined that if Buckley "only meant to give us stories", he "still missed many of the best ones", calling Buckley a "careless, slipshod worker." However, Gibson-Hill concluded that if the information compiled by Buckley were "handled more carefully", it would be "of value" as an account of Singapore's early history.

In a review of the 1965 edition of the book, historian John Sturgus Bastin noted that it "fails to point out, however, that a lot of the information is unreliable", and found it "regrettable" that Gibson-Hill's 1954 review had not been reprinted as an introduction or even referenced. Gordon P. Means noted in his review that while Buckley's "interpretation of events is questioned or challenged", the "wealth of information" presented within "makes it a valuable source book on Singapore's early history." B. Harrison states that it "was well worth re-publishing for its lively if limited treatment of an era in Singapore's history." Edwin Allington Kennard of The Straits Times wrote that while the detail is "often excessive", there are "nuggets even in a long and boring account of amateur theatricals, or in the prosiest of speeches by governors and local worthies who clearly never knew when it was time to stop."

Craig A. Lockard reviewed the 1984 edition of the book, opining that Buckley "predictably shared most of the local British ethno-centric biases of the time" and that the average reader who was unfamiliar with or "lacking a passionate interest" in Singaporean history "will be deterred by a mass of detail and (by today's standards) a rather unengaging writing style." Lockard also criticised the "misleading or naive" statements, though concludes that while it "presents some serious problems" and its "specialized nature and cost will limit its appeal chiefly to academic specialists and research libraries", it also includes "occasional tidbits of value" and "some important material unavailable elsewhere" and thus "merits republication". He praised the introduction as "helpful". Chiang Hai Ding opines that the work's reliance on newspaper clippings and personal accounts "endowed it with life and colour but at the same time rendered it liable to inaccuracies and bias", though he noted that his accounts still "enhance the value of his contribution" to Singaporean history.

Ang Seow Leng of BiblioAsia called it an "important publication as it offers a selected archive of historical documents that may no longer be available besides acting as a useful reference guide to the who’s who in the Singapore of the time." Buckley's description of local rituals has since been described as "sometimes offensive and ignorant".
