= Starcevich Monument =

- Tugu Peringatan Starcevich
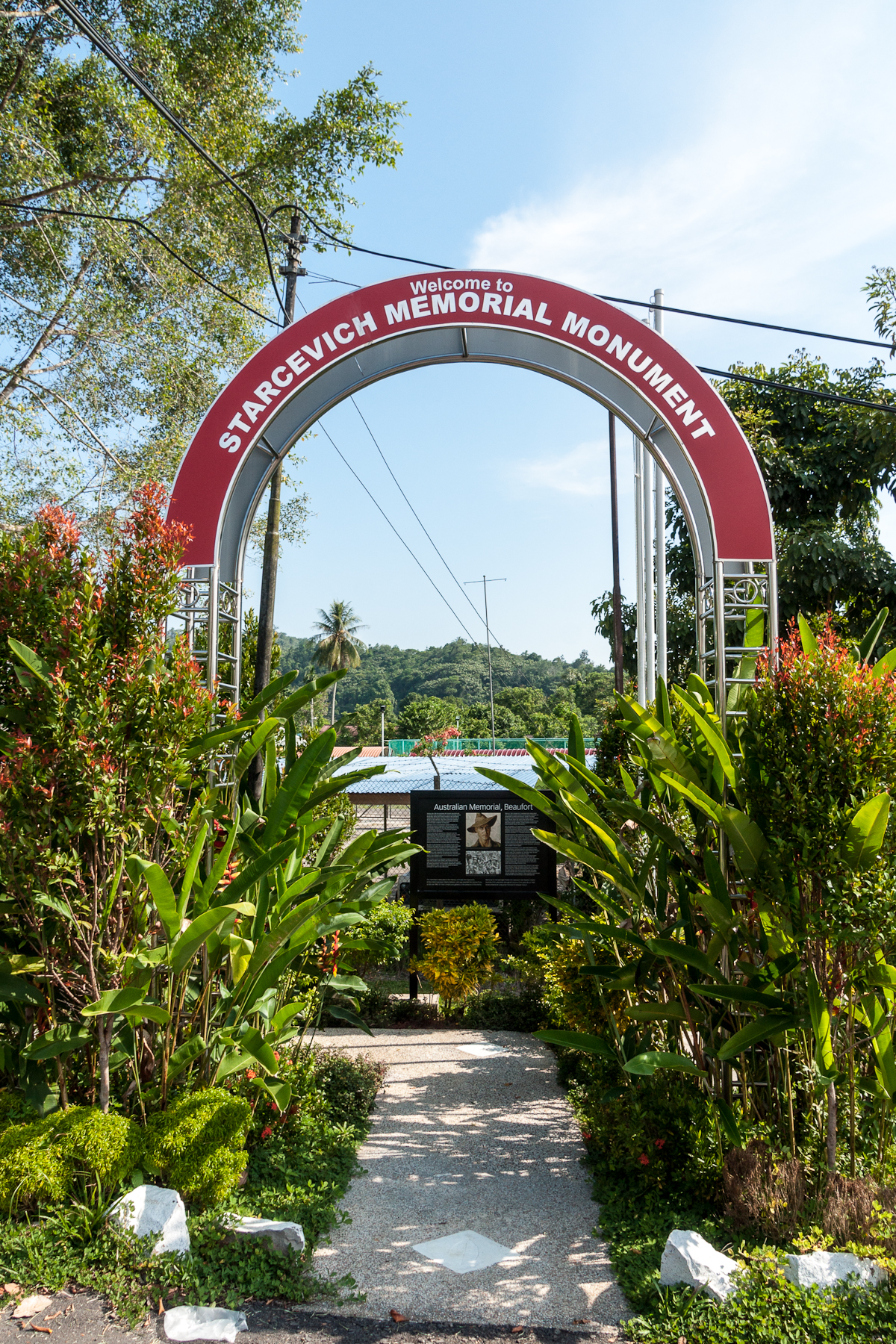
- The gate to the monument.
- Interactive map of Starcevich Monument
- Location: Beaufort
- Coordinates: 5.343165°N 115.746814°E
- Type: Stele
- Dedicated to: Tom Starcevich

The Starcevich Monument or Beaufort Australian Monument (Malay: Tugu Peringatan Starcevich, Tugu Peringatan Beaufort) is a monument in the town of Beaufort in Sabah, Malaysia dedicated to Tom Starcevich from the 9th Division Army of Australia during the reconquest of the town by the Allied forces on 28 June 1945.

== History ==
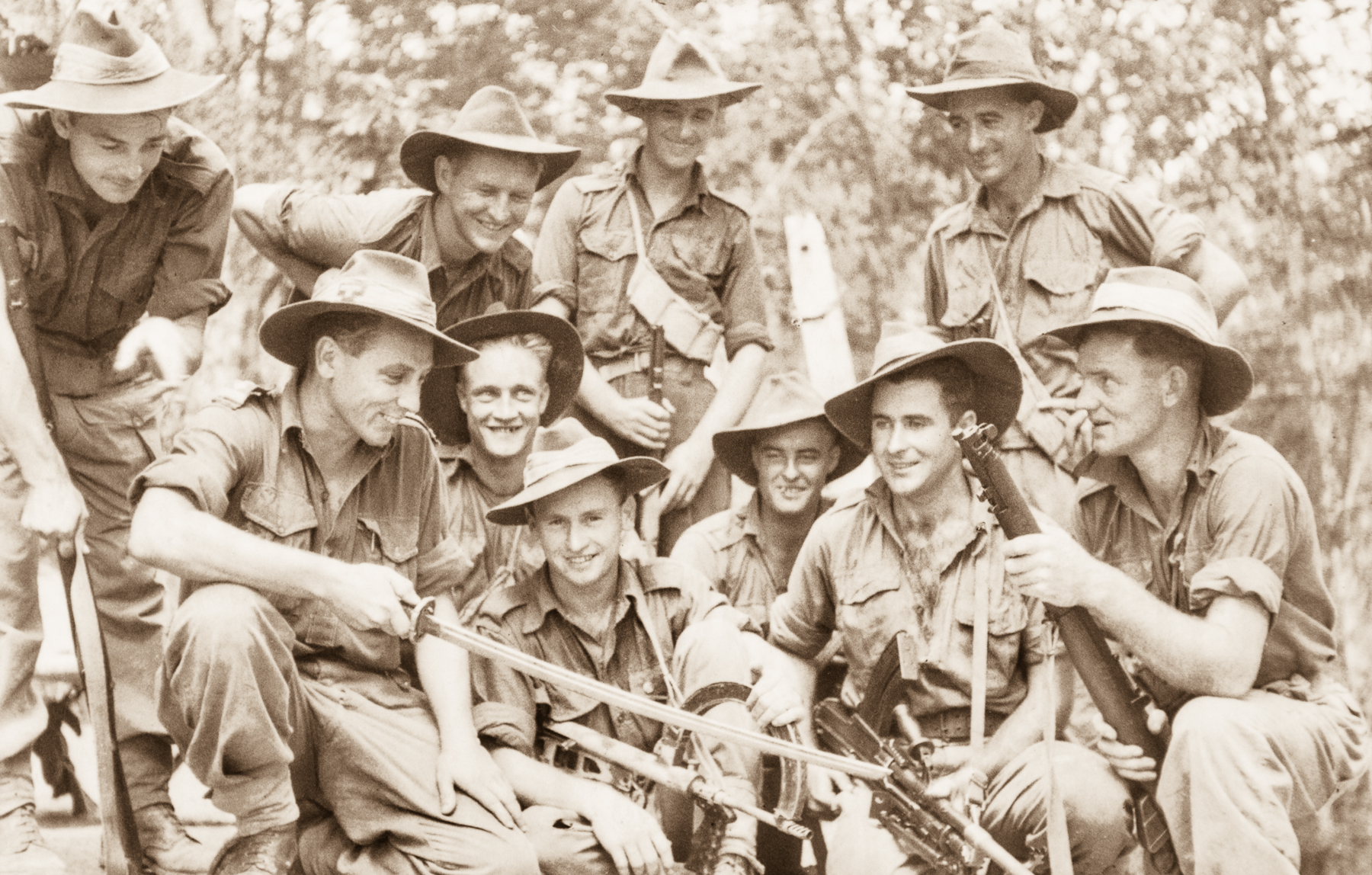
Tom Starcevich on 27 June 1945 (front row, second from right).

In June 1945, after a series landings of Australian forces on the Brunei Bay, the Australian troops preparing their attack and continued to recaptured Labuan, Muara Besar, Brunei Town, Weston and Beaufort. The first battalion from 2/32nd landed in Weston on 16 June but found the area has already been left by the Japanese. Other battalions followed in the next day when parts of the 2/43rd Battalion and 2/11th Commando Squadron landed at Mempakul. After a series of reconnaissance, the Australian found soon the Japanese had located their base in Beaufort. The Australian 2/32nd and 2/43rd Battalion began their attack on 27 June against the 386th Japanese Independent Infantry Battalion under Major Kimura Jiro.

On evening 27 June, most of the 2/43rd Battalion already fought their way into the town, while the others remained outside the town to cut off any enemy escape route. The following morning, a unit of Australians during a patrol at a nearest jungle was already under heavy machine gun fire from the Japanese. One of the Australian soldier, Tom Starcevich later led two counter-attacks and destroyed the enemy positions by using his Bren machine gun. For his bravery, Starcevich was awarded with the Victoria Cross.

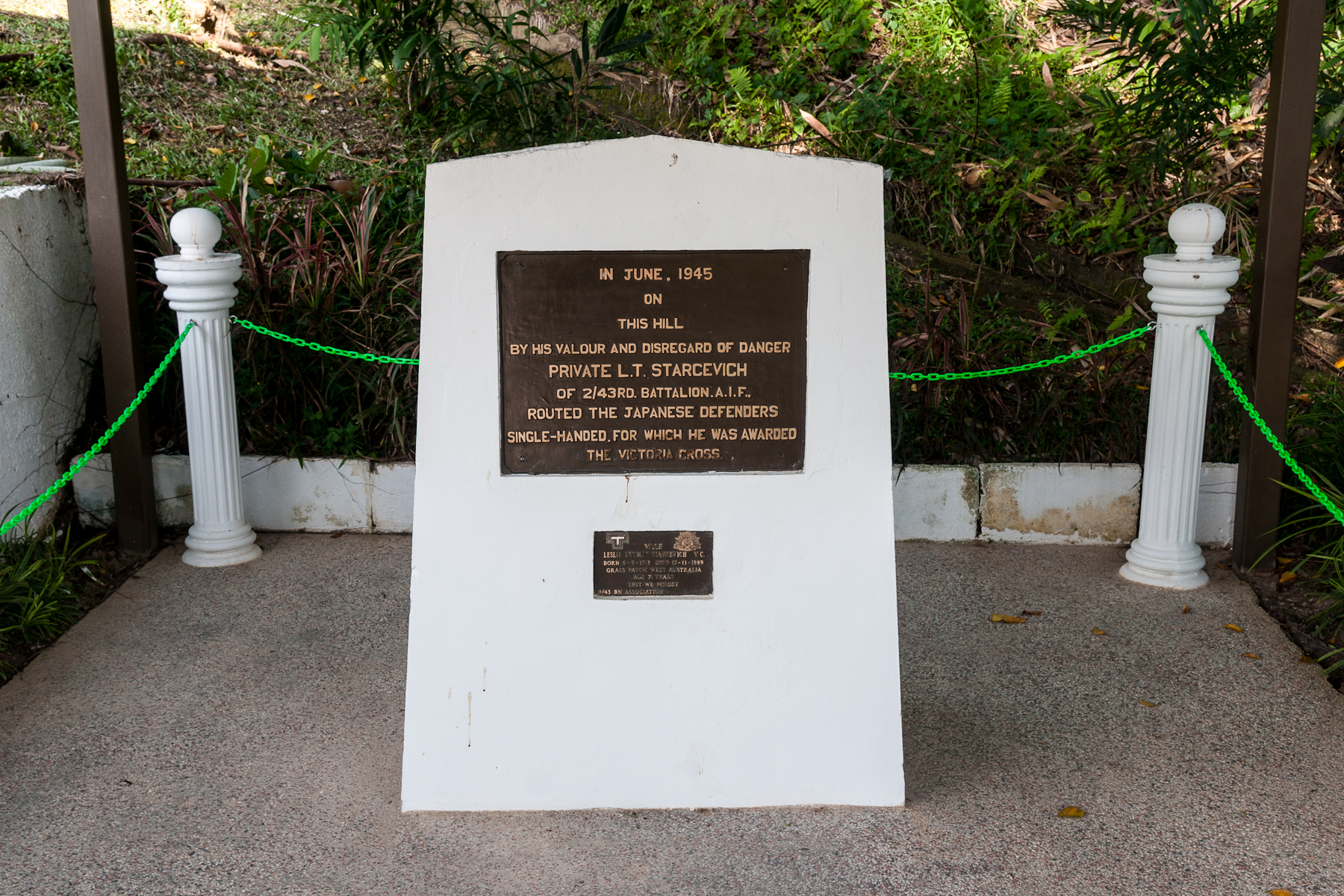
The monument.

A monument later erected by the citizens of Beaufort as a gratitude to the Australian forces for liberating the town. The monument in the form of a memorial stone was originally located in the front of a police station.

=== Inscription ===
The monument is in the form of a stele of about one metre in height. The cross section is rectangular; the stele tapers upward slightly and is topped by a flat top. On the front with a metal sheet been inserted and the inscription is in English:

In June 1945
On
This Hill
By His Valour And Disregard Of Danger
Private L.T. Starcevich
of 2/43rd. Battalion.A.I.F.
Routed The Japanese Defenders
Single-Handed, For Which He Was Awarded
The Victoria Cross.

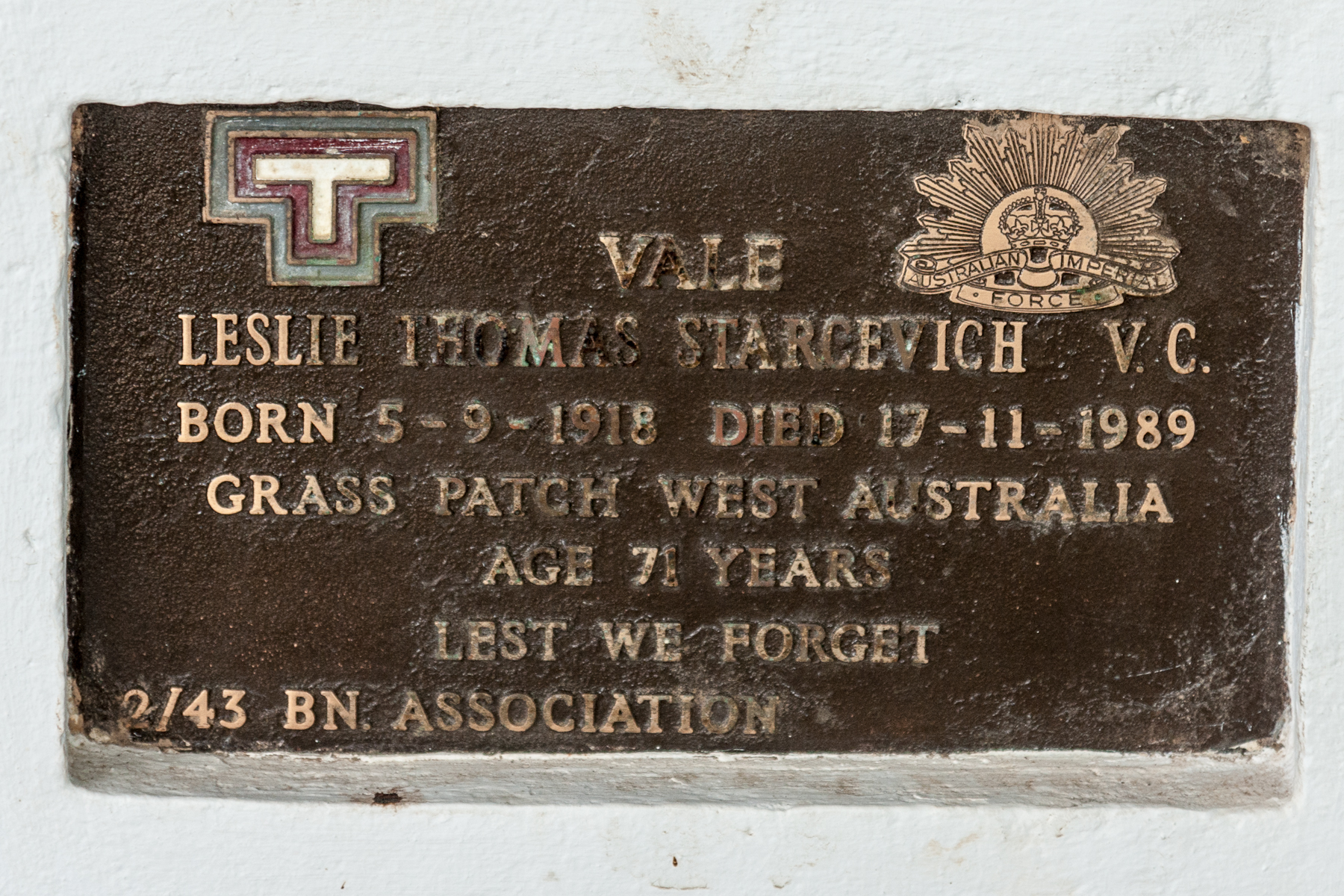
The 1990 plate.

Starcevich died in November 1989 at the age of 71 years in Western Australia. At the suggestion of his World War II comrades Stanley Toomey, another smaller metal plate was used in June 1990. Under the regimental character "T" and the coat of arms of the Australian Imperial Force is the inscription:

Vale
Leslie Thomas Starcevich V.C.
Born 5-9-1918 Died 17-11-1989
Grass Patch West Australia
Age 71 Years
Lest we Forget
2/43 BN. Association
