= Charles Buckley =

Charles Buckley may refer to:

- Charles A. Buckley (1890–1967), U.S. representative from New York
- C. W. Buckley (Charles Waldron Buckley, 1835–1906), U.S. representative from Alabama
- Charles Burton Buckley (1844–1922), historian, businessman and lawyer in Singapore
- Hayden Buckley (golfer) (Charles Hayden Buckley, born 1996), American golfer
