= Singapore Free Press =

Former newspaper in Singapore

The Singapore Free Press
- Type: Daily newspaper
- Format: Broadsheet
- Founders: William Napier; Edward Boustead
- Founded: 1 October 1835
- Ceased publication: 28 February 1962 (not in circulation from 1869 to 1884)
- Relaunched: 15 May 1946
- Language: English
- Headquarters: Singapore, Straits Settlements
- City: Singapore, Straits Settlements

The Singapore Free Press was an English-language daily broadsheet newspaper based in Singapore.

== History ==
The paper was founded on 1 October 1835 as the Singapore Free Press & Mercantile Advertiser in response to the sale of The Singapore Chronicle from William Renshaw George to James Fairlie Carnegy. It is "not clear" who all of its founders were. William Napier and Edward Boustead are known to have been founders while John Henry Moor, formerly the editor of the Chronicle, was the founding editor. Charles Burton Buckley named Napier, Boustead, merchant Walter Scott Lorrain and Superintendent of Public Works George Drumgoole Coleman as founders. However, Carl Alexander Gibson-Hill argued that Buckley's "observations should be viewed with suspicion when they cannot be confirmed from other sources." Gibson-Hill argued that Lorrain was "definitely" not a founder as he was still the proprietor of the Chronicle when the first issue of the Free Press was published.

Napier edited the paper from foundation until 1846 when he returned to Scotland. Abraham Logan took over the paper in 1846 running the Free Press for the next twenty years. His brother, James Richardson Logan, ran the Penang Gazette which produced cross-pollination of copy between the two papers and a mutual dislike of the East India Company. The Free Press, by then edited by Jonas Daniel Vaughan, remained in circulation until 1869 when increased competition from The Straits Times led to its closure. In 1884 the paper went back into circulation under the editorship of Charles Buckley.

The Singapore Free Press was bought over by The Straits Times and was revived with its first publication on 15 May 1946, it was published as a daily. The takeover was mainly to fend off competition from Malaya Tribune, which was launched in 1914. The paper merged with the Malay Mail in on 28 February 1962.
