= Abraham Logan =

Singaporean businessman (1816–1873)

Abraham Logan (13 August 1816 – 20 December 1873) was the owner and editor of the Singapore Free Press. Also a prominent lawyer, having studied law in Edinburgh, Logan played a significant role in the historic transferral of the Straits Settlement to the Colonial Office.

His father being Thomas Logan, Abraham Logan was born in Hutton Hall, Berwickshire, Scotland. Secretary to the Singapore Chamber of Commerce from 1850, until his retirement in 1868, Logan was pivotal in the changing of hands of the Straits Settlement. On 1 April 1867, the transfer was finally made, with a bit of help from allies in London.

Living most of his life on Pleasant Mountain, Thomson Road, Logan later moved to Penang in 1869, after the death of his brother, James Richardson Logan. Resigning from most of his activities in Singapore, Logan died in Penang on 20 December 1873.
