= Charles Burton Buckley =

British historian and journalist (1844–1922)

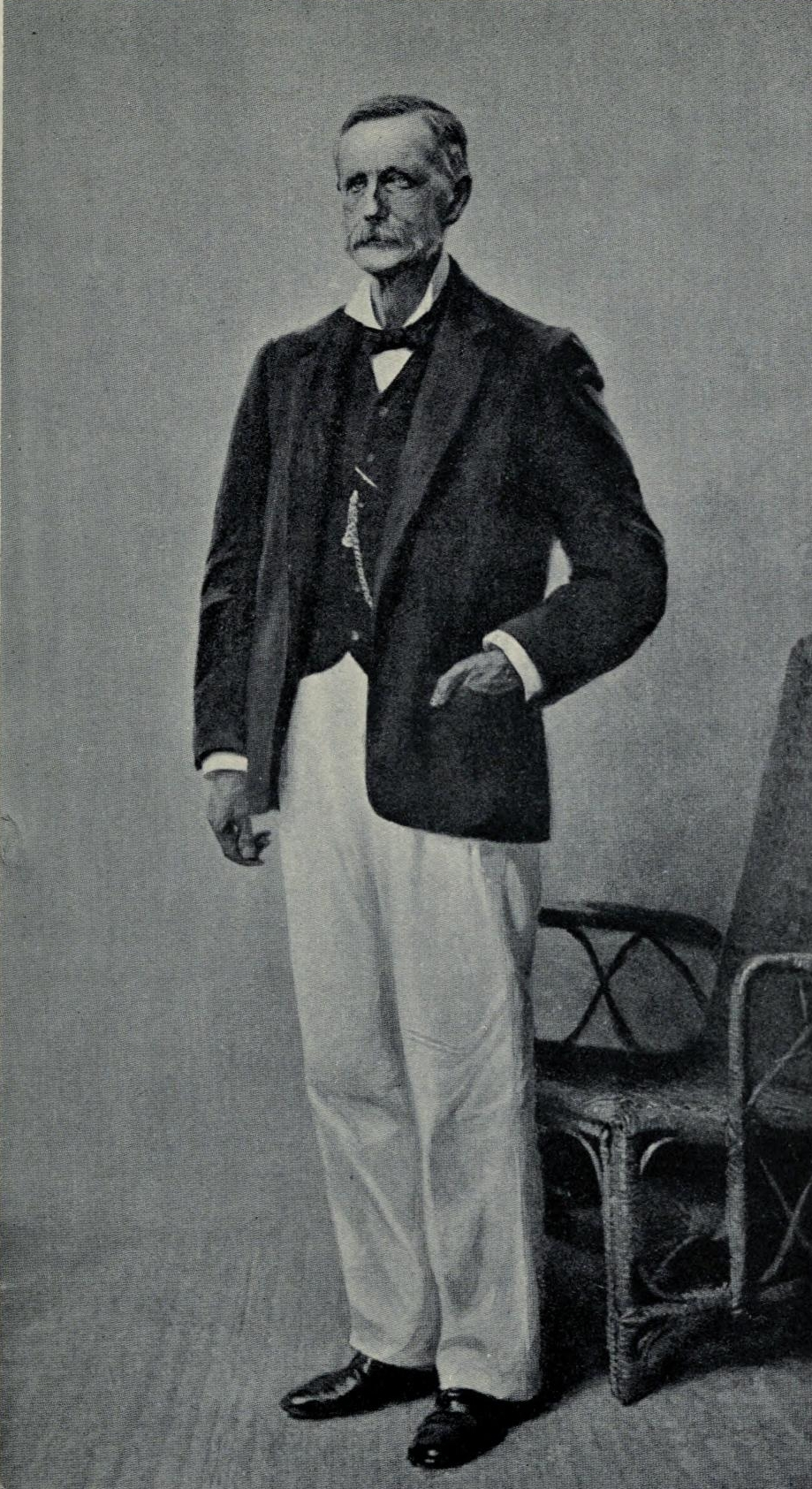
Charles Burton Buckley

Charles Burton Buckley (30 January 1844 — 22 May 1922) was a prominent historian, businessman and lawyer in Singapore. He revived The Singapore Free Press in 1884 and wrote An Anecdotal History of Old Times in Singapore.

== Early life and education ==
Buckley was born in London on 30 January 1844. He was the second son of vicar John Wall Buckley and his wife Elizabeth Burton, who had ten children, including Arabella Buckley and Henry Buckley, 1st Baron Wrenbury. He was educated at Winchester College. However, owing to his poor health, he did not go to university. William Henry Macleod Read, a family friend and his neighbour who was the head of the A. L. Johnston & Company in Singapore, suggested that he move to Singapore, as his doctors recommended a warmer climate. Read also offered Buckley a job at the company.

== Career ==
Buckley arrived in 1864 and was employed at A. L. Johnston & Company. In 1875, he left for Johor to work at the Chendras Gold Mine, which was near Mount Ophir. He returned to Singapore soon after and began studying law. He also served as an assistant to Thomas Braddell, the Attorney-General of the British Colony of Singapore. In 1877, he became a partner of Rodyk & Davidson. He served as the confidential advisor to Sultan Abu Bakar of Johor and later Sultan Ibrahim of Johor. In 1884, he acquired and revived The Singapore Free Press, a weekly newspaper that ceased publication in 1869. He also introduced a history column in the newspaper, which he later expanded in 1887, when he converted the newspaper into a daily newspaper. In 1904, he was appointed the honorary financial and general adviser to the Johor government. He retired from this position in early 1910.

In 1901, he completed An Anecdotal History of Old Times in Singapore, which attempted to chronicle the history of early Singapore. The book was published in two volumes by Fraser & Neave in December 1902. In a 1954 review of the book for the Journal of the Malaysian Branch of the Royal Asiatic Society, Carl Alexander Gibson-Hill criticised the book for its lack of accuracy, and described Buckley as a "careless, slipshod worker". In the review, Gibson-Hill wrote: "There is no doubt that Buckley was not the right man to have tackled the compilation of the Anecdotal History in natural capacity or training. Equally ill-health and too many activities left him with insufficient time to do the work properly." However, he wrote that much of the book's contents, if "more carefully handled", would be "of value, as Buckley intended that it should be, as an account of the early years of Singapore."

== Personal life and death ==
Buckley was an amateur stage actor and manager, and a singer. He performed in several amateur theatricals and concerts in Singapore, and was a committee member of the Singapore Amateur Musical Society. He held annual Christmas parties for children. He was also the first person in Singapore to drive his own car, a 4.5-horsepower Benz Viktoria.

In March 1911, he went on a trip to England with Ismail of Johor. He fell ill on the trip and died in London on 22 May 1922. Following his death, a portrait of him was commissioned and hung in the Victoria Theatre and Concert Hall.
