= Muara Besar Island =

Island in Brunei Bay

Native name: Pulau Muara Besar Nickname: PMB
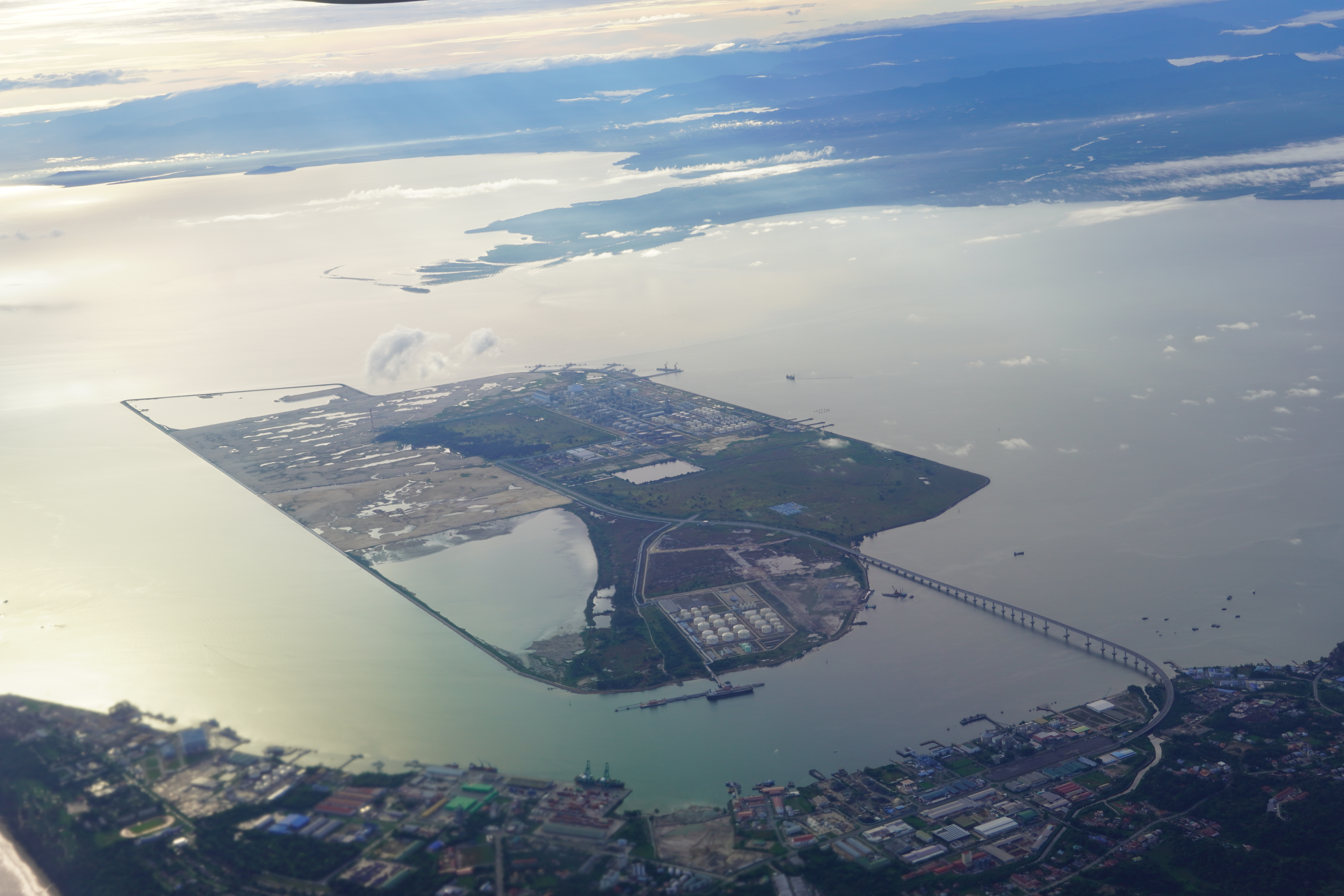
- Muara Besar Island, photographed on the flight from Brunei to Kota Kinabalu

- Location in Brunei

Geography
- Location: Brunei Bay
- Coordinates: 5.0060444°N 115.0999753°E
- Archipelago: Malay Archipelago
- Area: 9.636 km^{2} (3.720 sq mi)
- Highest elevation: 6 m (20 ft)

Administration
- Brunei
- District: Brunei–Muara
- Mukim: Serasa

Demographics
- Population: 0

Muara Besar Island (Note: It can be noted that the island may be referred to Muara Island (Pulau Muara) in older works.) (Malay: Pulau Muara Besar, Abbrev: PMB) is an island in Mukim Serasa, Brunei–Muara District, Brunei. As part of the Belt and Road Initiative (BRI), China invested in the Hengyi Industries refinery and petrochemical complex on the island through the Zhejiang Hengyi Group. The development also includes deep-sea port facilities, industrial embankments, and the Pulau Muara Besar Bridge.

PMB also played a recurring role in Brunei's history, first serving as an anchorage for James Brooke and the Royal Navy in the 1840s to monitor political unrest, and later as a strategic site during the Second World War. In June 1945, as part of Operation Oboe 6, Australian forces targeted Japanese defences on the island, securing PMB through coordinated land, air, and naval assaults. The island subsequently became an anchorage and support base for the Allied forces until the war's end.

== Geography ==
PMB is located within Brunei Bay, south of the South China Sea, and is part of Mukim Serasa in the Brunei–Muara District. The island is flat, marshy, and measures 3.5 miles (5.6 km) in length and 1 mile in width. Positioned on the west side of Pelumpong Point's entrance, PMB is sparsely populated, with the forest canopy, which becomes denser toward the eastern end, reaching heights of 60 to 100 feet (18 to 30 m). At Sapo Point, the southeastern tip of the island, there was a small cluster of casuarina trees. Two beacons are situated at the point's extremity. To the south of the island, an anchorage exists in 7–8 fathoms (42–48 ft; 13–15 m) of mud, 600–800 yards (550–730 m) away from Sapo Point.

Muara Port, a sheltered area between PMB and the western coast, is 3 miles long and 400 to 800 yards wide, with depths ranging from 3 to 5½ fathoms on a mud bottom. The primary entrance to the harbour, Muara Bar, is a narrow 13-foot-deep waterway between PMB and Bedukang Island, suitable for vessels with a draft of up to 15 feet after half flood, and for deeper vessels up to 17 feet if well-marked. Anson Passage, to the north of PMB, is suitable only for small vessels with a draft of less than 9 feet due to its 7-foot depth at low-water spring tides. South of Sapo Point, a navigable channel of about 6 fathoms connects several small rivers to the sea, including the Limbang River.

A mangrove forest is present on the inhabited island. The island is home to migratory birds, shoebirds, primary forests and forest swamps. In 1988, it was recommended that 90 hectares (220 acres) of the southeast end of the island to be protected. Only the naturalist Carl Alexander Gibson-Hill, during 1949–1950, documented seeing Irrawaddy dolphins in Brunei, notably near Brooketon (present day Muara) at the entrance of the Brunei River and surrounding PMB, where he saw "some numbers." The British Museum (Natural History) also has a skull of an Irrawaddy dolphin that was taken from the island.

== History ==
In July 1842, James Brooke's ship, the Royalist, anchored off PMB, a low, sandy island near the mouth of the Brunei River. Known for its abundance of wild boars and excellent fishing. Situated along the northwestern coast, the island acted as a natural bridge between the striking coastal landscapes north of Brunei Town (now Bandar Seri Begawan) and the more subdued lowland shores to the south. Brooke anchored off PMB in July 1846 with the help of Sir Thomas John Cochrane and the Royal Navy. From this vantage point, Brooke could keep an eye on events in Brunei, where Sultan Omar Ali Saifuddin II's agents were trying to create dissatisfaction in Brooke's territory. Brooke appreciated England's support even if at first he intended to act on his own initiative. Given the intricate political landscape, Cochrane chose not to become involved in Brunei's domestic affairs directly. However, the navy demonstrated England's presence and willingness to uphold regional stability by anchoring off the island.

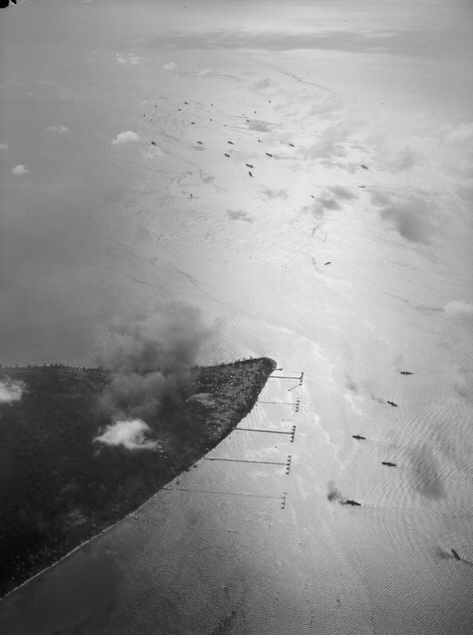
Aerial photograph of the Japanese-built piers on the island in 1945

PMB was strategically significant during the Second World War, particularly in Operation Oboe 6 in June 1945, when Australian forces attacked Japanese positions in Brunei. As part of the broader campaign to liberate Borneo, the Australians targeted key coastal defences on PMB, which included anti-aircraft positions near Cape Sapo and Brooketon overlooking Yellow Beach. Although the Japanese fortifications here were not as formidable as those on Tarakan, they still posed a threat to amphibious landings, with artillery and anti-aircraft guns positioned to disrupt an assault. The Japanese garrison, despite being understrength and poorly supplied, could still inflict heavy casualties if they chose to fight to the last man. At Cape Sapo, on the island’s southern tip, the occupiers had constructed five piers, about 300 metres in total length in waters 10 metres deep, to allow amphibious supply ships to dock during their occupation of Brunei.

As part of a coordinated divisional effort, the 20th Brigade, under the command of Brigadier Victor Windeyer, was tasked with securing PMB during Operation Oboe 6. The brigade was to attack both Green Beach on the Bruneian peninsula and White Beach on PMB simultaneously, with Yellow Beach becoming operational once the island was secured. To clear the southern channel around the island and provide access to Yellow Beach, the 2/15th Battalion was assigned the mission of landing at White Beach and then moving southwest to capture Cape Sapo and Red Beach.

Prior to the PMB landing during Oboe 6, pre-landing air operations were conducted in two phases. (Note: XIII Bomber Command with the 380th and 90th Heavy Bombardment group B-24s attack different targets in Borneo, while seven SB-24s from the 868th Heavy Bombardment Squadron, located in Palawan, launch a nineteen-hour, 3,000 miles (4,800 km)-mile round-trip attack against PMB and other sites.) From 3 May to 7 June, US and Australian bombers targeted Japanese military positions in Brunei Bay and other areas. In the second phase, from 7 June to Z Day, the focus shifted to supporting minesweeping operations, convoy protection, and targeting specific enemy positions, including those on PMB. On 9–10 June, bombings were carried out over mainland Brunei, PMB, and Labuan Island every two hours. Additionally, naval minesweeping operations cleared a channel into Brunei Bay, while the Cruiser Covering Group conducted bombardments to mark the approach to White Beach.

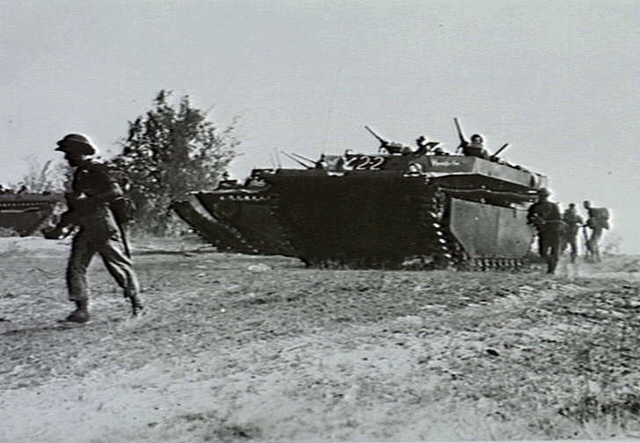
The 20th Brigade's soldiers and an LVT landing on the island in 1945

Following intense air and naval bombardment, the 2/15th Battalion successfully landed at White Beach. While an initial disorganization due to a trailing right flank caused some confusion, the subsequent waves landed without incident. There was no enemy defence of the shore, and by 17:45, the battalion had secured the island with no opposition. The beachhead was established, and Yellow Beach was opened for logistical support after engineers cleared rubble from the beach, causing a slight delay in the unloading of supplies. The successful seizure of PMB enabled operations in the area to continue. On 19 June, men from the 2/15th Battalion departed from Yellow Beach, heading to the LSTs off PMB.

The USS Willoughby (AGP-9) played a vital role in supporting operations around PMB. In June 1945, the ship operated in Brunei Bay with a key anchorage at PMB, participating in missions around Brunei Bay. The ship provided essential support to Australian forces during Oboe 6. From July 1945 until the end of the war, the ship was stationed at the island. On 15 August 1945, when Japan accepted the terms of the Potsdam Declaration and offensive operations came to an end, the ship stayed at PMB until September. During this time, the ship tended to PT boats and supported Australian occupation forces in North Borneo. It also conducted several missions, including transporting troops and supplies, before returning to Brunei Bay in late September.

In 1967, a temporary site at PMB was selected to serve as the Government Marine Base, with the suggestion to establish a veterinary quarantine station on the island. Since 1980, and continuing through its recent developments, various areas of the island have been utilised for training by the Royal Brunei Armed Forces.

== Economy ==
=== Petrochemical ===
The initial development of a container port and manufacturing cluster at PMB, backed by a B$300 million budget under the 2007–2012 National Development Plan, shifted focus to the petrochemical sector. The development of PMB as a deepwater container port and manufacturing hub gained momentum with the signing of an MoU with Philippine port operator ICTSI and a Master Planner agreement with Singapore's Surbana consortium in October 2008.

The PMB master plan encompasses a halal food export processing zone and a manufacturing complex for large-scale companies, along with plans for an aluminum smelter to enhance port operations. The PMB petrochemical project involves the construction of embankments to create an industrial park on reclaimed land. These embankments total approximately 16,079.6 metres in length, consisting of a 2,617-metre south embankment, a 2,574.4-metre northwest embankment, a 5,894-metre north embankment, a 3,700-metre east embankment, and a 1,294.2-metre torch area embankment. The torch area features a permeable structure with a top elevation of 5.14 metres and a width of 14 metres, while the embankments have a crest elevation of 3.80 metres and a width of 4 metres.

Major port infrastructure bids were set to open in 2010. In 2011, Brunei's Ministry of Finance and Economy approved Zhejiang Hengyi Group's entry, establishing Hengyi Industries and initiating development on the island. By July 2011, Brunei had approved Zhejiang Hengyi Group's US$2.5 billion oil refinery and aromatics cracker project. Phase 1 of the refinery, covering 260 hectares (640 acres), was scheduled for completion in 2015 and is set to produce gasoline, diesel, jet fuel, paraxylene, and benzene, generating 800 local jobs.

PMB became a flagship BRI project in Brunei, centred on the Hengyi Industries refinery and petrochemical plant. During President Xi Jinping's 2018 visit, both countries reaffirmed their commitment to advancing this joint venture. Phase 2, estimated at US$3.5 billion, is expected to create an additional 1,200 jobs. The project will also boost local industries by offering training opportunities, logistical support, and procurement services. Connected by the Pulau Muara Besar Bridge, completed in May 2018, and a deep-sea container port, the PMB Refinery operated by Hengyi Industries in the PMB Industrial Park joins two other Chinese companies, Zhejiang Hengyi Group and Damai Holdings. This industrial park spans 955 hectares (2,360 acres), dedicated to the petrochemical, oil, and gas sectors. Phase 1 and Phase 2 of the project are anticipated to complete between late 2019 and 2023, with Phase 2 construction beginning on 25 September 2020, marking a significant contribution to Brunei's GDP.

=== Maritime yard project ===
In order to consolidate all offshore oil and gas exploration and production support activities, an Integrated Marine Supply Base (IMSB) has been established on an 11-hectare plot of land on PMB's southern shoreline. The IMSB is intended to serve the oil and gas sector by offering complete support solutions that answer both immediate and long-term market demands for local and regional oil and gas services. It is a fully integrated facility with a fabrication yard.

Through a public–private partnership, Brunei is constructing its first comprehensive maritime vessel repair and decommissioning yard at Pulau Muara Besar. The goal is to establish a state-of-the-art facility that will serve the local customers, including Brunei Shell Petroleum, initially, and then the regional market, with maintenance, repair, and overhaul services for vessels in the region as well as asset decommissioning, materials recovery, and disposal services. Anson International has agreed to open the island as Brunei's first commercial integrated marine maintenance and decommissioning yard (MMDY) to first meet local needs before expanding into other regions.

The 16 hectares (40 acres) integrated yard that will be built as part of the deal, which was signed on 29 June 2022, at the MoFE, will act as the anchor facility for the Brunei Darussalam Maritime Cluster (BDMC). The Adinin Group of Companies' Qaswa Holdings, a local lead partner in the joint venture, MoFE's Strategic Development Capital Fund, and two foreign companies—UK-based CessCon Decom for decommissioning and South Korea's Dongil Shipyard for marine maintenance—serve as lead technical partners for Anson. After a groundbreaking ceremony on 8 May 2024, the MMDY is expected to open for business by the third quarter of 2025.

== Activities ==
There are a number of fish farms in the sheltered area between Pelumpong Spit and PMB.

== Gallery ==
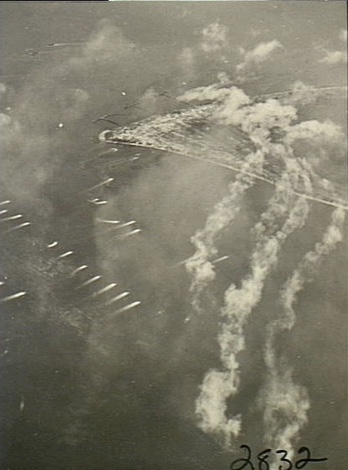
Australian soldiers landing on PMB in 1945

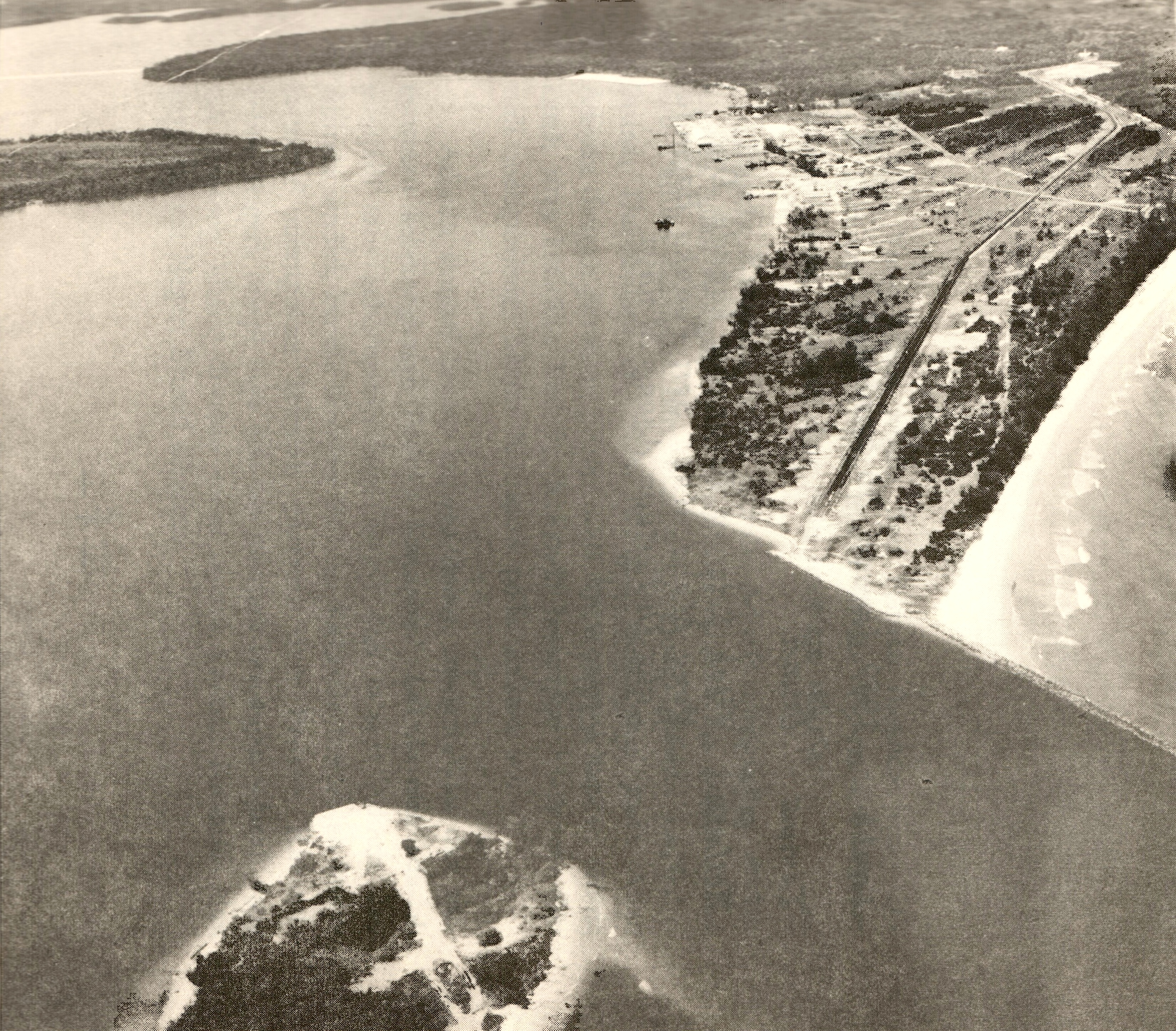
PMB (left) in 1959–1967

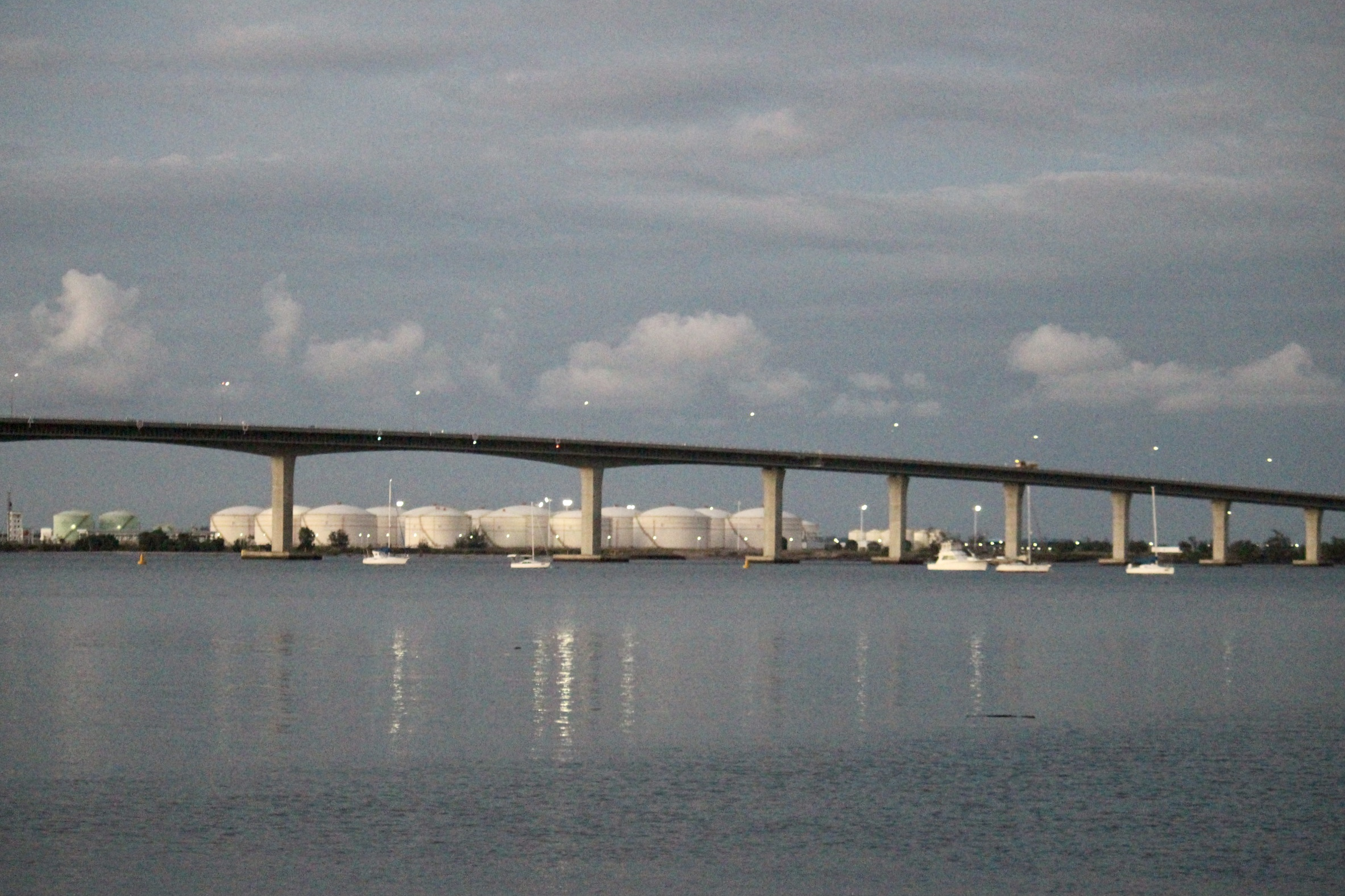
Pulau Muara Besar Bridge in 2022

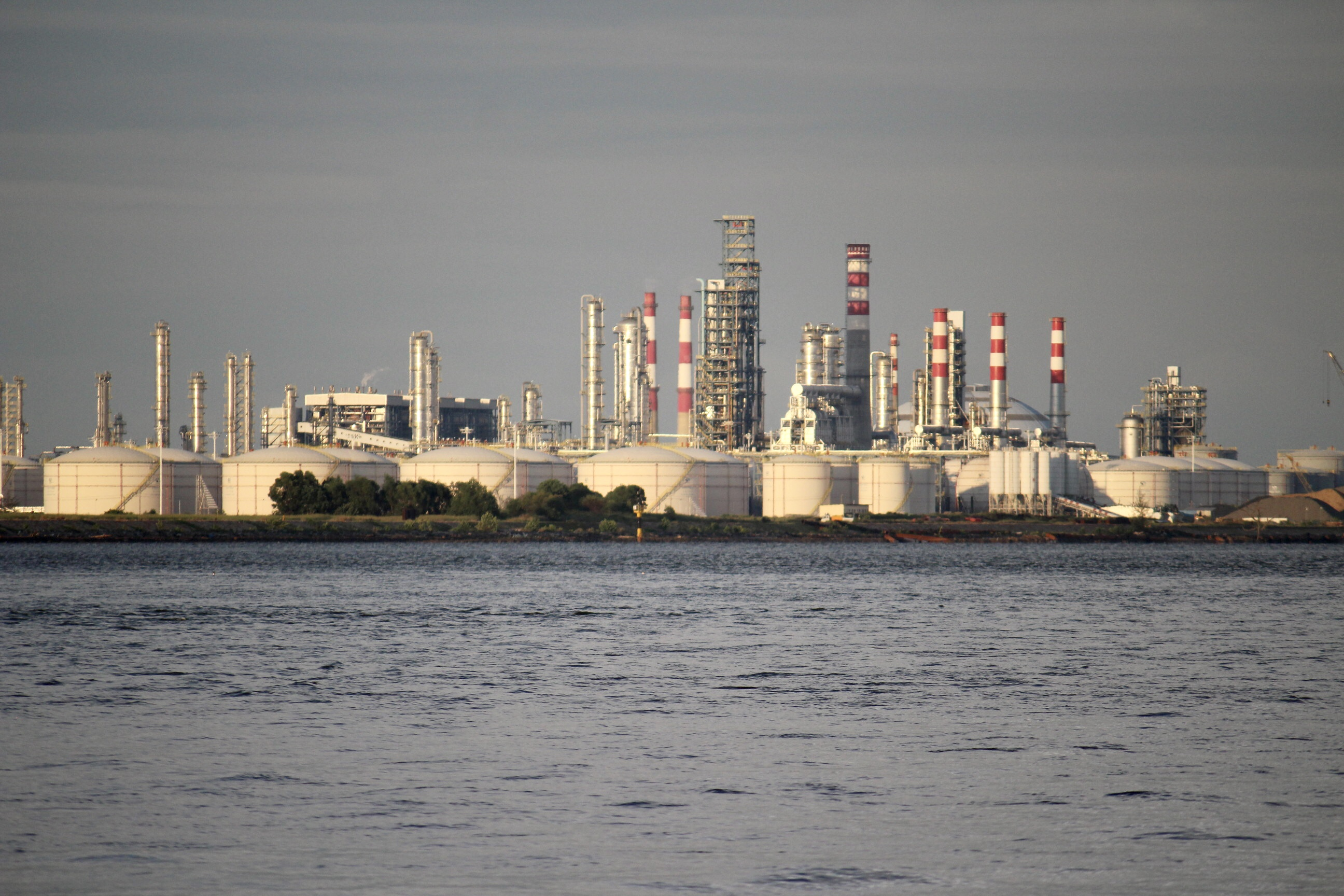
PMB Refinery seen from Serasa Beach in 2022

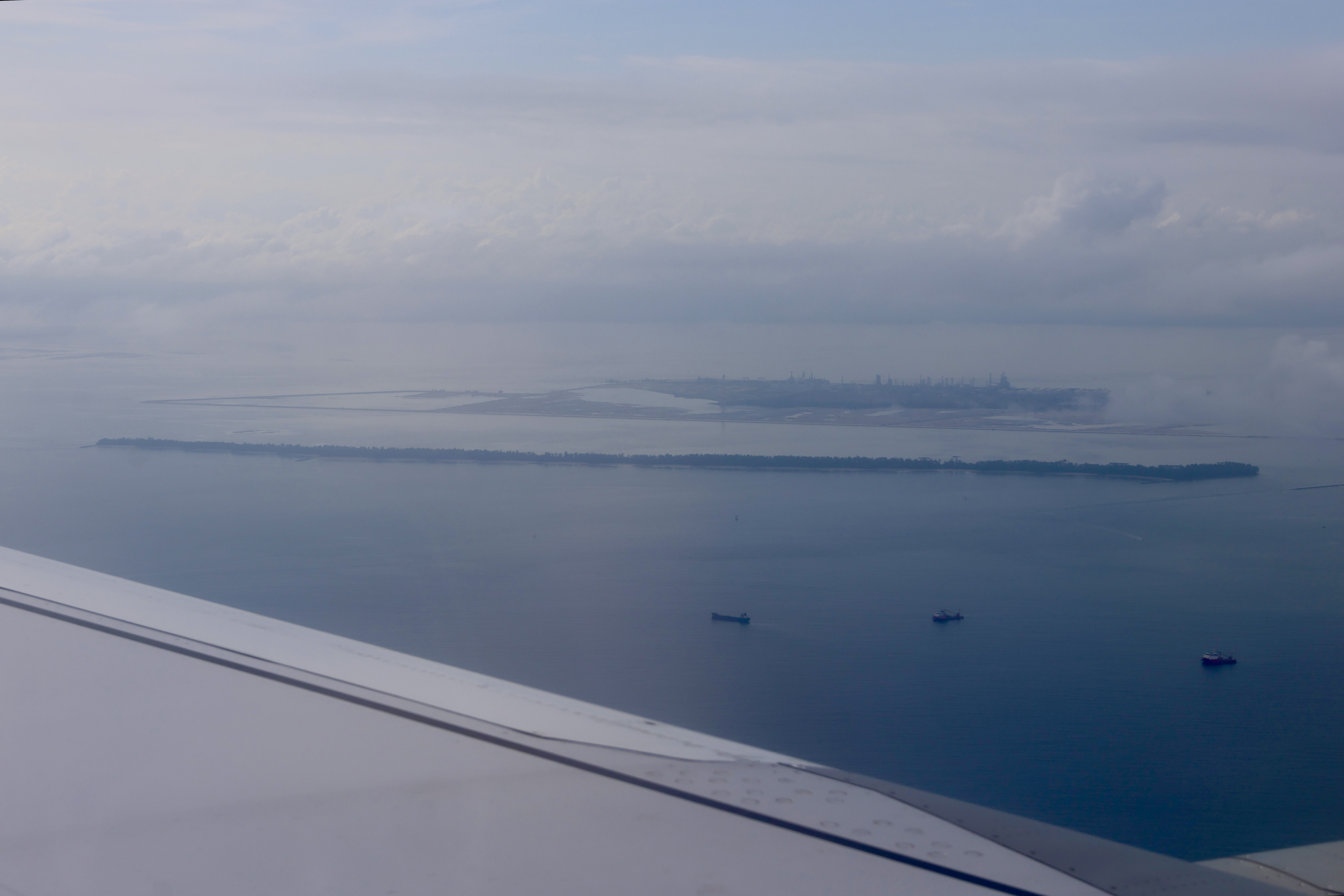
Pelumpong Spit (foreground) and PMB seen from a commercial aircraft in 2023

== Bibliography ==
- John, Spenser St. (1879). The Life of Sir James Brooke, Rajah of Sarawak: From His Personal Papers and Correspondence. Edinburgh and London: William Blackwood and Sons.
- McCarthy, Dayton (2022). Oboe Landings: 1945. Canberra: Simon & Schuster. ISBN 978-1-922615-81-7.
- Mooney, James L. (1981). Dictionary of American Naval Fighting Ships. Vol. VIII. Washington: United States Government Publishing Office. ISBN 978-0-16-002055-1.
- Silvestre, Geronimo (1992). The Coastal Resources of Brunei Darussalam: Status, Utilization and Management. WorldFish. ISBN 978-971-8709-11-5.
- United States Hydrographic Office (1915). Asiatic Pilot: Sunda Strait and the Southern Approaches to China Sea with West and North Coasts of Borneo and Off-lying Dangers. Vol. V (1st ed.). Washington: United States Government Publishing Office.
