= Prince of Wales Island Gazette =

19th century English-language newspaper in Penang

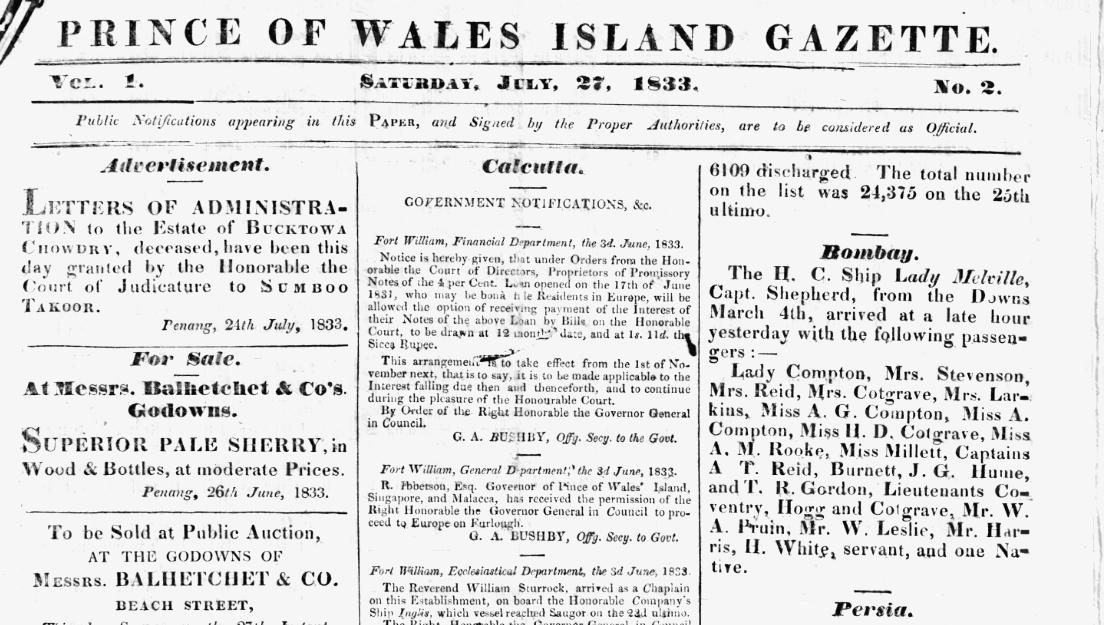
- Prince of Wales Island Gazette, 27 July 1833
- Type: Weekly newspaper
- Founder: East India Company
- Founded: 1806
- Ceased publication: 1836
- Language: English
- City: George Town, Penang
- Price: 7 Spanish dollars by quarterly subscription

The Prince of Wales Island Gazette was a newspaper established in 1806 in Penang by the East India Company. It was the first English-language newspaper published in Malaya, and was superseded by the Pinang Gazette and Straits Chronicle in 1838.

== History ==
The Prince of Wales Island Gazette was the first newspaper published in English of any kind in Malaya. Founded by the East India Company, which had controlled Penang since 1786 when Francis Light landed on the island, its first edition was published on 1 March 1806.

The newspaper ran from 1806 until 1827, and then from 1833 to 1836. Its first publisher was A. B. Bone, an Indian born Englishman who had previous experience working on newspapers in India. When Bone died in 1817, he was succeeded by B. C. Henderson who was replaced two years later by William Cox, headmaster of the Penang Free School who also ran a printing establishment.

In 1827, the newspaper was closed down after 22 years on the orders of the government due to its objections about an article which appeared in the newspaper which, according to the government, "contained observations on the Treaty concluded with Siam." From 1827 to 1830, it was replaced by the Pinang Register and Miscellany and then the Government Gazette of Prince of Wales Island, Singapore, and Malacca. After it was revived in 1833 under Cox, it ran for three more years before it was finally discontinued on Cox's death in 1836, to be superseded by the Pinang Gazette and Straits Chronicle.

Published weekly, the Prince of Wales Island Gazette was read by staff of the East India Company and European traders who paid a quarterly subscription of seven Spanish dollars. It contained official government notices, local news and opinion and some foreign stories. The East India company provided regular funds to support the publication, and placed its crest on the masthead with the words, "published under the authority and patronage of the Government."
