= Gagging Acts =

The Gagging Acts was the common name for two acts of Parliament passed in 1817 by Conservative Prime Minister Lord Liverpool. They were also known as the Grenville and Pitt Bills. The specific acts themselves were the Treason Act 1817 and the Seditious Meetings Act 1817.

These acts were passed within a series of bills by the government of the United Kingdom in order to curb and suppress reformist demands by campaigners and corresponding societies, culminating in the Six Acts of 1819, after the Peterloo Massacre.
