= Pulau Muara Besar Bridge =

Pulau Muara Besar Bridge Jambatan Pulau Muara Besar
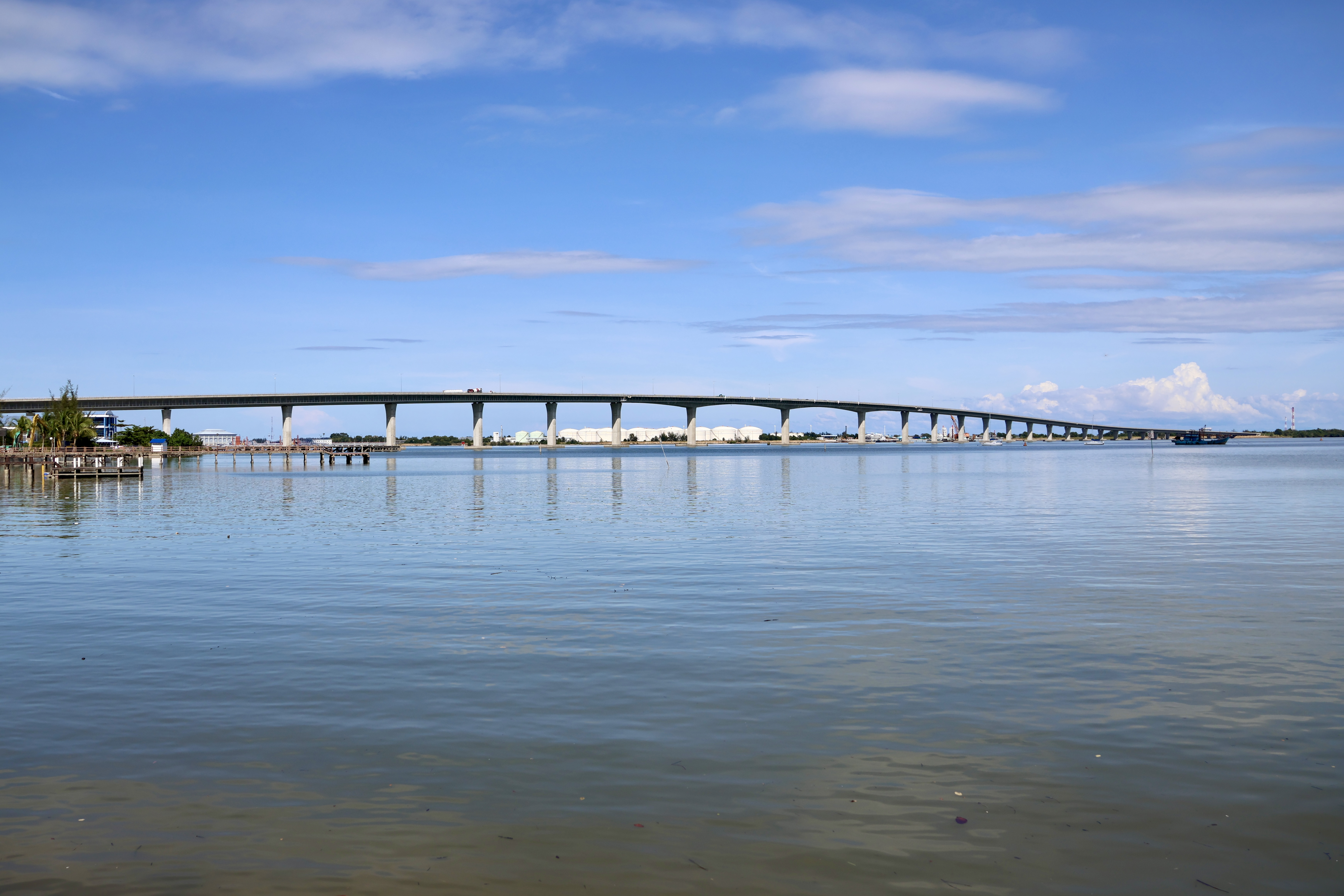
- Coordinates: 5.004996°N 115.075923°E
- Carries: Motor vehicles
- Crosses: Brunei Bay
- Locale: Serasa, Brunei-Muara, Brunei

Characteristics
- Total length: 2,680 m (8,793 ft)
- Width: 23 m (75 ft)
- No. of lanes: 4

History
- Constructed by: China Harbour Engineering Company
- Construction start: May 2015
- Construction end: May 2018
- Construction cost: B$260 million (US$204 million)

Location
- Interactive map of Pulau Muara Besar Bridge

Pulau Muara Besar Bridge is a dual-carriageway bridge which connects Pulau Muara Besar (PMB), an island on Brunei Bay, with the mainland of Brunei via Serasa in Brunei-Muara District.

== Construction ==
By linking PMB to the mainland at Serasa, the bridge is anticipated to facilitate utility connectivity as well as the island's industrial growth. A Korean–Brunei collaboration was chosen to provide project consulting in August 2012 following an open procurement in 2011. The bridge's original concept was for it to connect to a proposed 4 kilometres (13,000 feet) road that would travel to an industrial location on the eastern end of the island, crossing Brunei Bay 2.8 kilometres (9,200 feet) from Serasa industrial park to the southwest side of PMB. After stakeholder talks to establish bridge and utility standards, engineering design work was scheduled, and by late 2012, a request for proposal for construction was anticipated.

The construction began in 2015 and completed in May 2018; it was undertaken by China Harbour Engineering Company at a cost of B$260 million or US$204 million. The bridge is part of the road infrastructure that will serve the petrochemical refinery plant on the island, which is currently under construction, and is a Chinese foreign direct investment. Upon completion, the bridge is 2,680 metres (8,790 feet) long and 23 metres (75 feet) wide. At present, access to the bridge is restricted to authorised personnels of the project.
