= Francis James Bernard =

Singapore Police Chief

Personal details
- Born: July 6, 1796 Westminster, London, England
- Died: 19 December 1843 (aged 47) Batavia, Dutch East Indies
- Spouse: Esther Farquhar (m. 1818; died 1838)
- Children: Alfred George Farquhar Bernard (son)
- Parents: Charles Bernard (father); Mary Ford (mother)
- Relatives: Margaret (Sinclair) Trudeau (3x Great-granddaughter); Justin Trudeau (4x Great-grandson)
- Profession: Police Chief
- Police career
- Allegiance: British Empire
- Department: Singapore
- Branch: Police Force
- Service years: 1820–1826
- Rank: Police Assistant

Francis James Bernard (6 July 1796 – 19 Dec 1843) was the first police chief of the Police Force in Singapore and the founder of the Singapore Chronicle, the first newspaper in Singapore.

Bernard was appointed as the first Master Attendant when Singapore became a trading port in February 1819. In addition to advising the governor on nautical matters, he was responsible for the control of shipping lying in the roadstead. He was succeeded by William Lawrence Flint, the brother-in-law to Sir Stamford Raffles, in April 1820. The Master Attendant designation would later renamed as Director of Marine in 1964.

In May 1820, Bernard led the first police force in Singapore as the Police Assistant under the direction of his father-in-law Major William Farquhar, who would only receive the official sanction from Raffles in August 1820.

Bernard had no previous experience, and the police force, which consisted of just 12 men, had limited resources. He first worked out of his own residence, an attap house which was completed in December 1820 and in close proximity to Farquhar's residence (present day location of Old Supreme Court Building), before being relocated to a stone building in 1823, which was formerly one of an English merchant Captain Methven's godowns at Ferry Point (close to the lawn in front of the main entrance of present-day Victoria Theatre and Concert Hall). There were also lockups at the basement of this building.

In 1823, Bernard started planting coconuts and become the pioneer coconut estate planter on the eastern coast of Singapore.

Bernard also founded the Singapore Chronicle newspaper in 1824.

The police force was later put under command of the Resident Councillor John Prince, after Singapore became part of the Straits Settlements in 1826.

== Personal life ==
Bernard married Esther Farquhar, William Farquhar's eldest daughter with his Malaccan-French mistress, Antoinette "Nonio" Clement.
