= Mary Turnbull =

Singaporean historian (1927–2008)

Constance Mary Turnbull
- Born: Constance Mary Turnbull; 9 February 1927; West Lyham, near Wooler, Northumberland, England
- Died: 5 September 2008 (aged 81); Oxford, England
- Education: Stoke Park Grammar School, Coventry
- Alma mater: Bedford College, University of London
- Occupations: Historian, author
- Spouse: Leonard Adrian Rayner (m. 1962; died 1995)
- Children: 2
- Writing career
- Period: 1971–2008
- Subject: Singaporean history
- Notable works: The Straits Settlements 1826–67: Indian presidency to crown colony (1972); A History of Singapore (1977); Dateline Singapore: 150 Years Of The Straits Times (1995)

Constance Mary Turnbull (9 February 1927 – 5 September 2008) was a British historian known for her work on Southeast Asian history, in particular on the history of Singapore. Her expertise on Singapore history and citations from her book The Straits Settlements was instrumental to the case presented by the Singapore legal team to the International Court of Justice, in claiming sovereignty over Pedra Branca in 2008.

== Early life and education ==
Mary Turnbull was born the only child to David Turnbull (1900-1961), a native farm-owner in the Cheviot Hills, and Edna Mary Williamson (1901-1991), a schoolteacher from Laxey in the Isle of Man, on a farm not far from Wooler, Northumberland. In the 1920s Coventry grew to be the centre of UK motor industry, and her family moved to the thriving city when her father, who had been forced give up farming as a result of the Great Depression, found a job in motorcar engineering at the Rootes car factory. Throughout her childhood, Mary Turnbull led a happy but simple life despite having to live with different relatives during the Great Depression, while her parents were both looking for work in Coventry and being evacuated several times during World War II. She often described the experience of living through the Coventry Blitz and later, as a university student, the "doodlebugs" (V-1 flying bombs) in London.

Mary Turnbull went to study at Bedford College, London in 1944 and graduated in 1947.

== Biography ==
After graduation from Bedford College, Mary Turnbull worked for Imperial Chemical Industries in the staff training department. Looking for a more adventurous life, she joined the Malayan Civil Service, the first female administrative officer to be recruited to the Service, and one of only two women who would ever work in that capacity for the colonial authorities. She later joined the University of Malaya in Kuala Lumpur, but on her marriage to businessman Leonard Rayner in 1962, moved to Singapore. Here she was a member of the History Department until 1971 when she moved to Hong Kong to take up a post as lecturer at Hong Kong University's History Department. It was during her time in Hong Kong that Mary Turnbull first published her book History of Singapore.

In 1988, Mary Turnbull retired from her position as Head of the History Department at Hong Kong University, although she remained in Hong Kong until her husband, Leonard, also retired in 1990. The couple moved back to the UK and settled in the village of Sulgrave, Northamptonshire. Mary Turnbull continued to write, and travel around Britain, Europe, the United States, Australia and New Zealand and on occasions, visited Singapore and Malaysia. In the 1990s she was commissioned by The Straits Times to compile the history of the Singapore newspaper company and in 1995, Dateline Singapore: 150 Years Of The Straits Times that resulted from nearly 3 years' of work, was launched to commemorate the 150th anniversary of the founding of the newspaper title.

Following the death of her husband in 1995, Mary Turnbull moved to Oxford in 1999, where she became a fellow of St Antony's College and a member of Oxford University's Strategic Studies Group (OUSSG). On the afternoon of 5 September 2008, she was diagnosed with a serious heart condition during a routine check-up and died hours later of a ruptured aorta while awaiting surgery. She had completed the final revisions for the third edition of A History of Singapore, just days before her death.

Mary Turnbull was posthumously inducted to the Singapore Women's Hall of Fame in 2014.

== Bibliography ==
- Mills, L. A. (1961) British Malaya, 1824-67. Singapore: Malayan Branch Royal Asiatic Society.
- Turnbull, C. M. (1969) Modern Singapore a commemorative for Singapore's 150th anniversary
- Turnbull, C. M. (1972) The Straits Settlements, 1826 - 67: Indian Presidency to Crown Colony. London: Athlone Press.
- Turnbull, C. M. (1977) A History of Singapore, 1819 - 1975. Singapore: Oxford University Press.
- Turnbull, C. M. (1989) A History of Singapore, 1819 - 1988. Singapore: Oxford University Press.
- Turnbull, C. M. (1980, 1981, 1989) A History of Malaysia, Singapore and Brunei. Sydney: Allen & Unwin.
- Turnbull, C. M. (1995) Dateline Singapore: 150 years of the Straits Times. Singapore: Times Editions
- Turnbull, C. M. (2009) A History of Modern Singapore 1819 - 2005 (published posthumously). Singapore: NUS Press.
