= Carl Alexander Gibson-Hill =

English doctor, ornithologist and curator

Carl Alexander Gibson-Hill (23 October 1911 – 18 August 1963) was an English medical doctor, naturalist, ornithologist and curator of Singapore’s Raffles Museum.

His main interest, area of expertise and legacy of published knowledge was the natural, geographical and cultural history of Malaya, Singapore and the historically associated Christmas Island and Cocos (Keeling) Islands.

Gibson-Hill was born in Newcastle upon Tyne, England, grew up in Birmingham, and was educated at Malvern College in Worcestershire and Pembroke College, Cambridge. In 1933 he graduated with a Second in Natural Science Tripos, and subsequently enrolled at the King's College Hospital Medical School.

In 1938 Gibson-Hill married a fellow houseman, Margaret Halliday, before departing to serve as the resident medical officer on Christmas Island in the eastern Indian Ocean. He was there from September 1938 to December 1940, following which he moved to work on the Cocos (Keeling) Islands for another ten months, where he was joined by his wife after she had completed her medical training. During his time on these islands he studied the local fauna, making collections of specimens for the Raffles Museum.

Towards the end of 1941 the couple went to Malaya where she found a job at the Alor Star general hospital while he was appointed a health officer in Singapore's health department. He was also made Assistant Curator of the Raffles Museum. However, he had arrived in Singapore only four days before it fell to Japanese forces, and was soon interned in Changi as a prisoner of war, though his wife had managed to escape.

Three months after being released from internment, in 1945 Gibson-Hill boarded a whaler bound for South Georgia on an expedition to collect specimens for the Falkland Islands Museum, and to photograph Antarctic seabirds. In March 1946 he finally returned to England on an oil tanker on which he served as health officer. He returned to Singapore in 1947, becoming Curator of Zoology at the Raffles Museum. For two years he was also Acting Professor of Biology at the Singapore College of Medicine. In 1956 he succeeded Michael Tweedie as Director of the Museum.

Gibson Hill also served in the Malayan Branch of the Royal Asiatic Society, which he had joined in 1940 and which was closely associated with the Museum, as Assistant Secretary and Treasurer (1947–1948), Secretary (1950–1955), Editor of its journal (1948–1961) and as President (1956–1961). He joined the Royal Photographic Society in 1948 and gained its Associate in 1948 remaining a member until his death.

Gibson-Hill's health began to deteriorate in the late 1950s; he was a diabetic and a heavy smoker and was often hospitalised for cerebral and general oedema. He was found dead at his home in Singapore shortly before he was due to retire as Director of the Raffles Museum. He was the last expatriate Briton to hold that position.

== Publications ==
Gibson-Hill was a skilled sketcher and photographer, talents he used to illustrate his many publications. He produced numerous scientific papers, often published in the Bulletin of the Raffles Museum and the Journal of the Malayan Branch of the Royal Asiatic Society. Books or book-length papers authored by him include:

- 1936 – Warwickshire. Frederick Muller: London. (Under the pseudonym of John Lisle).
- 1947 – British sea birds. Witherby: London.
- 1947 – Contributions to the Natural History of Christmas Island, in the Indian Ocean. Bulletin of the Raffles Museum, No. 18.
- 1949 – Birds of the coast. Witherby: London.
- 1949 – The Malayan landscape: seventy camera studies. Kelly & Walsh.
- 1949 – An Annotated Checklist of the Birds of Malaya. Bulletin of the Raffles Museum, No. 20.
- 1952 – Documents Relating to John Clunies Ross, Alexander Hare and the establishment of the Colony on the Cocos-Keeling Islands. Journal of the Malayan Branch of the Royal Asiatic Society, vol. 25, parts 4 and 5.
