= Statue of Saint Francis Xavier, Malacca =

Statue in Malaysia

Coordinates: 2°11′34″N 102°14′57″E

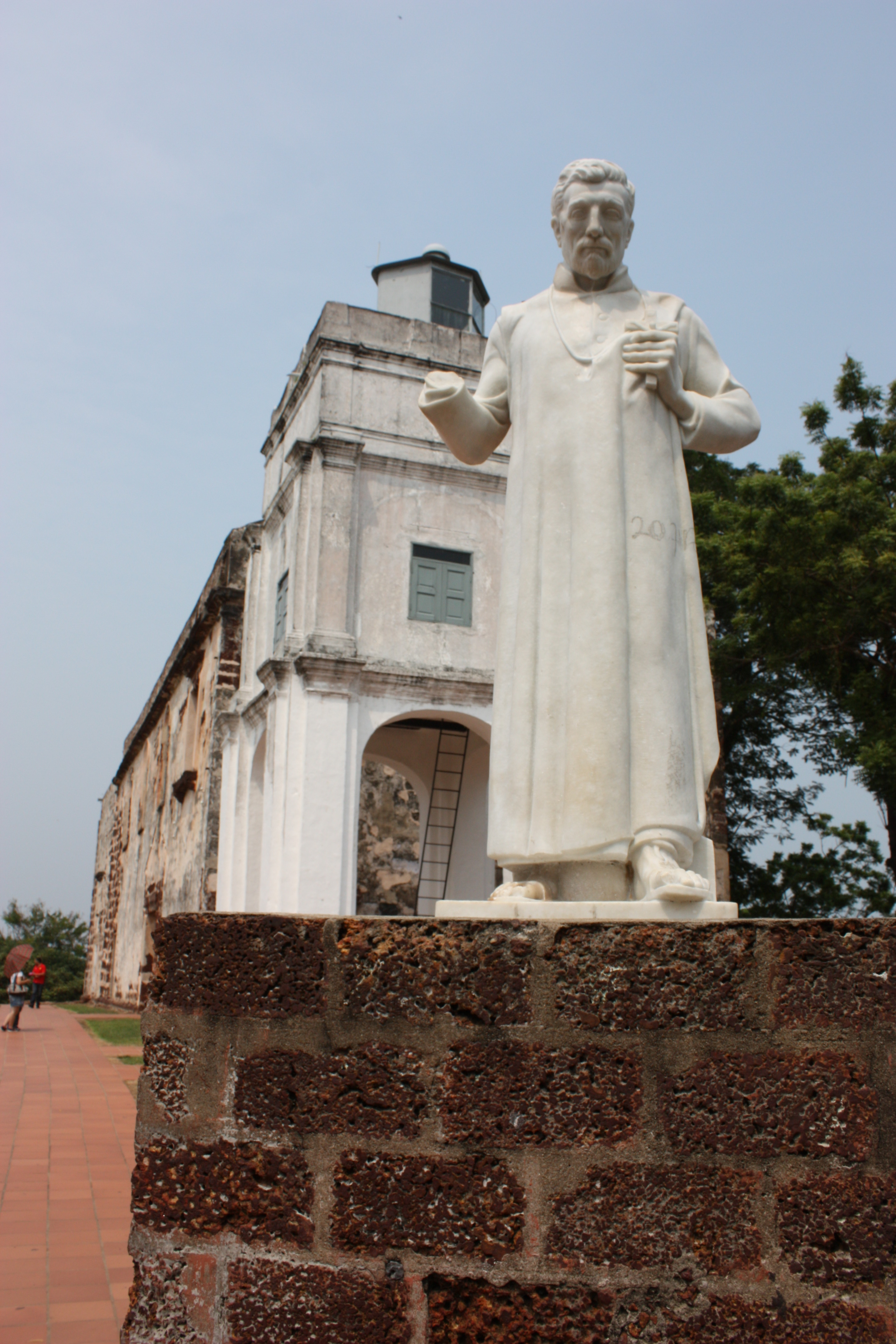
Statue of St. Francis Xavier standing in front of St. Paul's Church, Malacca, where he was temporarily buried after his death in 1553.

A statue of Saint Francis Xavier (1506–1552) stands outside the ruins of St. Paul's Church on St. Paul's Hill, Malacca City, Malaysia.

== Saint Francis Xavier's connection with Malacca ==
St. Francis Xavier was a Spanish Catholic missionary who travelled around Asia and stayed at Malacca on several occasions between 1545 and 1552. When he died of fever on his way to China in 1552 his body was brought to Malacca, and temporarily buried for nine months in St. Paul's Church, which is today marked by an open grave, before it was transported to Goa, India.

== Description ==
The statue was commissioned as part of Malacca's 4th centenary celebrations and was unveiled on 22 March 1953, 400 years to the day since the arrival of St. Francis Xavier's body in Malacca.

The statue was brought from Rome accompanied by Father Francis, a senior member of the Malacca Diocese, and placed on a temporary wooden pedestal inside St. Paul's Church. At the celebrations in Malacca which lasted ten days and which were attended by an estimated 10,000 people, a relic of the saint, being a bone of his right arm, was brought from Macau.

The marble statue is five and a half feet high and weighs 1,000 pounds. The figure appears dressed in a Jesuit cassock and holds a cross in his left hand. Since the statue was erected the right hand has been removed, and fingers and toes have been repeatedly taken, possibly for use as lucky charms.
