= Dutch Graveyard =

Cemetery in Malacca, Malaysia

- Perkuburan Belanda
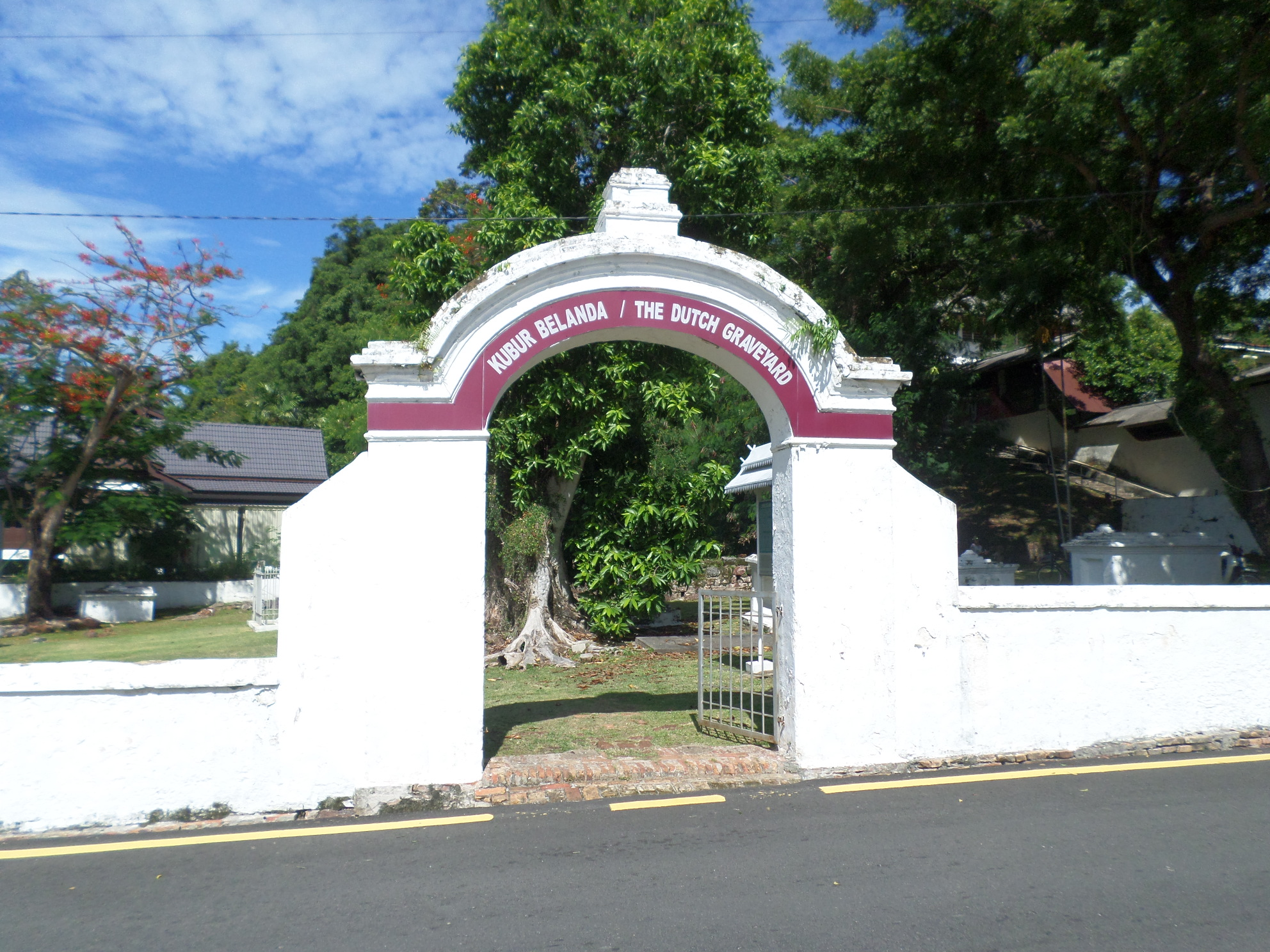
- Interactive map of Dutch Graveyard

Details
- Location: St. Paul's Hill, Malacca City, Malaysia
- Coordinates: 2°11′36.5″N 102°15′02.9″E
- Type: Cemetery

The Dutch Graveyard (Malay: Perkuburan Belanda) is a burial ground at the foot of St. Paul's Hill, Malacca City, Malaysia.

== History ==
The graveyard was first used during the last quarter of the 17th century during Dutch-ruled Malacca. It was used in two stages, the first being 1670–1682 and the latter being 1818–1838.

Despite the graveyard's name, the majority of decedents interred are British. The graveyard features 5 Dutch officers and 33 British officers and their spouses, including the graves of two lieutenants of the Madras Native Infantry who were killed in the Naning War of 1831 to 1832. Many of the Dutch tombstones were moved up to the ruined church on nearby St. Paul's Hill after Malacca was gradually transferred to British control from 1795.

== See also ==
- List of tourist attractions in Malacca
