= Church of Saint Paul, Malacca =

Malaysian historic church

Coordinates: 2.1928°N 102.2490°E

Saint Paul's Church
- Malay: Gereja St. Paul
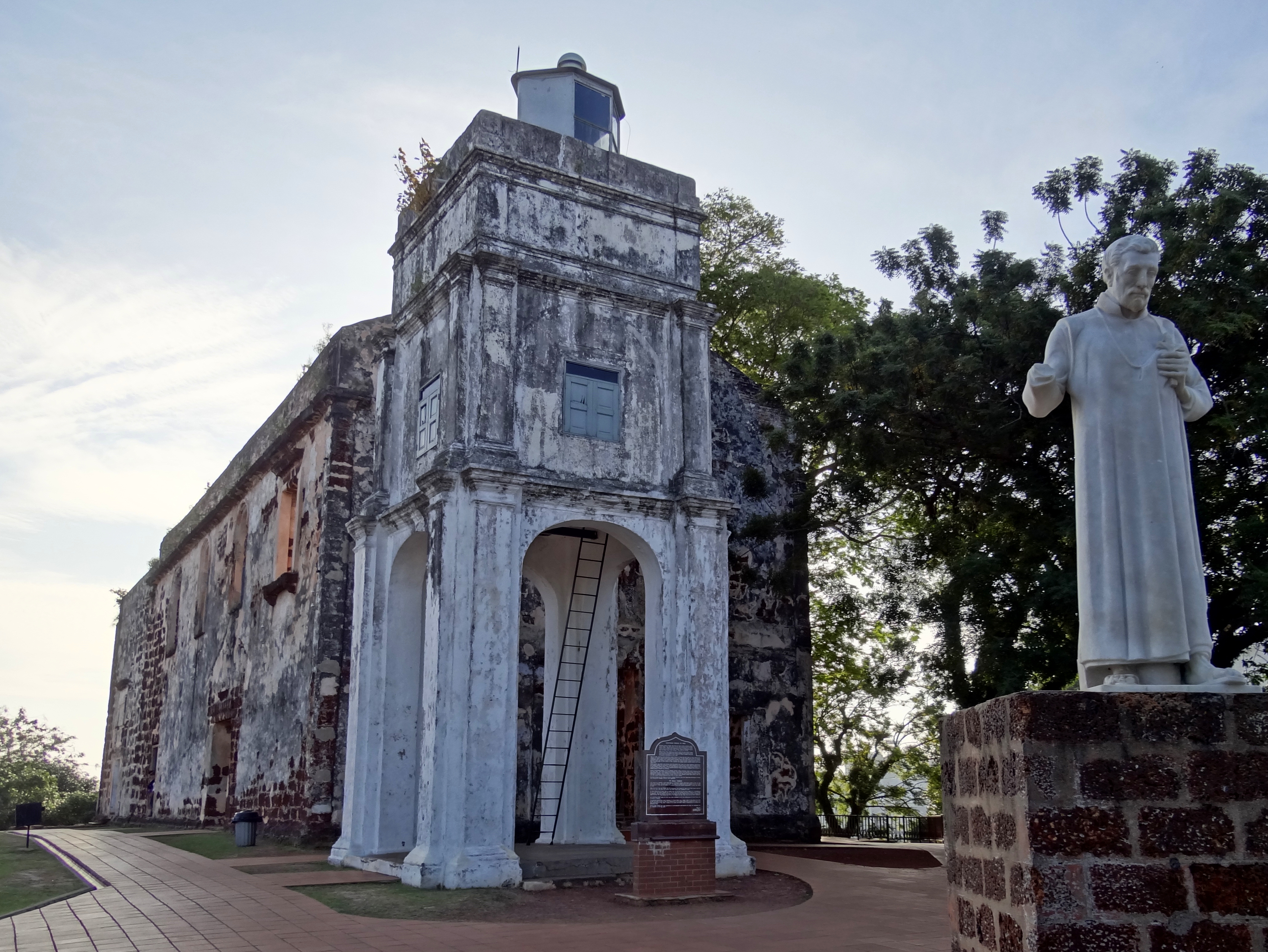

Religion
- Affiliation: Christianity (originally Catholic, later Dutch Reformed, now a museum)
- Ecclesiastical or organisational status: in ruins
- Year consecrated: 1521

Location
- Location: Malacca City, Malacca, Malaysia
- Interactive map of Saint Paul's Church

Architecture
- Type: Church

Saint Paul's Church is a historic church building in Malacca City, Malaysia, that was originally built from 1566 to 1590. It is the oldest European building east of India and the oldest surviving church building in Southeast Asia and the Far East. It is located on the summit of St. Paul's Hill.

Every year, the church will be used for feast day mass on the first Saturday of December in honour of the feast day of St Francis Xavier. The tradition was started by a priest from the church of St francis Xavier Melaka since 1922.

== History of the church ==
The first Catholic Church in Malacca was "Our Lady of the Annunciation," built by the Portuguese viceroy and military commander Afonso de Albuquerque at the bottom of the Hill near the colonial castle A Famosa in 1511. It later became the Cathedral Our Lady of the Assumption.

In 1521, a Portuguese colonial military commander named Duarte Coelho built a chapel dedicated to the Virgin Mary and known as Nossa Senhora da Graca (Our Lady of Grace), then Nossa Senhora Madre de Deos (Our Lady Mother of God). Coelho built the chapel as an act of gratitude following his escape from a Chinese fleet during a storm in the South China Sea.

The chapel was deeded to the Society of Jesus in 1548 by the Bishop of Goa, João Afonso de Albuquerque, with the title deeds received by St. Francis Xavier. The chapel was demolished in 1566 and the Jesuits built a new church named Nossa Senhora da Annunciada (Our Lady of the Annunciation). This church had three altars dedicated to Saint Ignatius of Loyola, the Eleven Thousand Virgins, and the Good Infant Jesus. the walls of the chancel were probably covered with azulejo tiles. The tower was equipped with a clock-dial.

A burial vault was opened in 1592 and many people of distinction were buried there, including Pedro Martins, the second Bishop of Funay, Japan.

=== Association with St. Francis Xavier ===
In 1548, St. Francis Xavier, with the help of fellow Jesuits Fr. Francisco Peres and Brother Roque de Oliveira, established a school in the premises of the chapel known as St. Paul's College. This was perhaps the first school in the modern sense to be established on the Malay peninsula.

Xavier used the chapel as his base for his missionary journeys to China and Japan. On one of those journeys, Xavier fell sick and in 1552 in Shangchuan Island, China he died.

In 1553, the body of Xavier was disinterred from Shangchuan Island and temporarily buried at the chapel before it was finally shipped to Goa. An open grave in the church still exists today that claims to mark the place of Xavier's burial. However, there is no historical evidence to connect this vault with Xavier.

In 1922, Fr. Jules François, parish priest of St Francis Xavier Church, started to celebrate a yearly Catholic mass in the Church. It is still celebrated today.

=== Renaming and abandonment ===
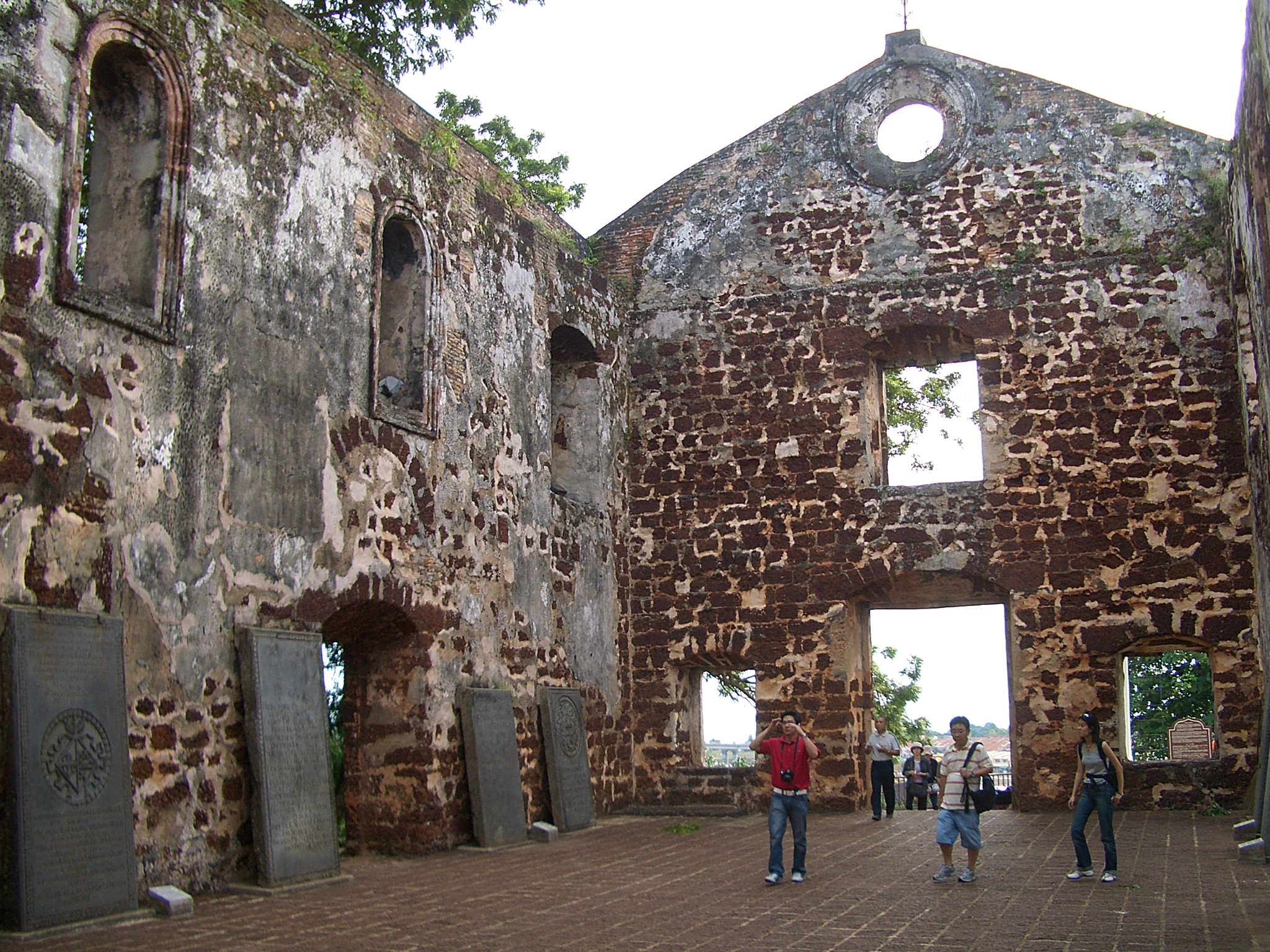
Interior of the church

With the conquest of Malacca by the Protestant Dutch in 1641, the church was renamed for Dutch Reformed use as "St. Paul's Church" also known as the Bovenkerk ('church on the top' (of the hill)). The church remained in use as the main church of the Protestant Dutch community until the completion of the Benedenkerk (Christ Church Malacca, the 'church at the bottom' (of the hill)) in 1753. The old church was then subsequently deconsecrated. The nave and the chancel of the church continued to be used as a churchyard.

As early as 1744, the church was used as a powder magazine. When the British occupied Malacca in 1824, the church continued to be used as a powder magazine.

=== Excavations and later additions ===
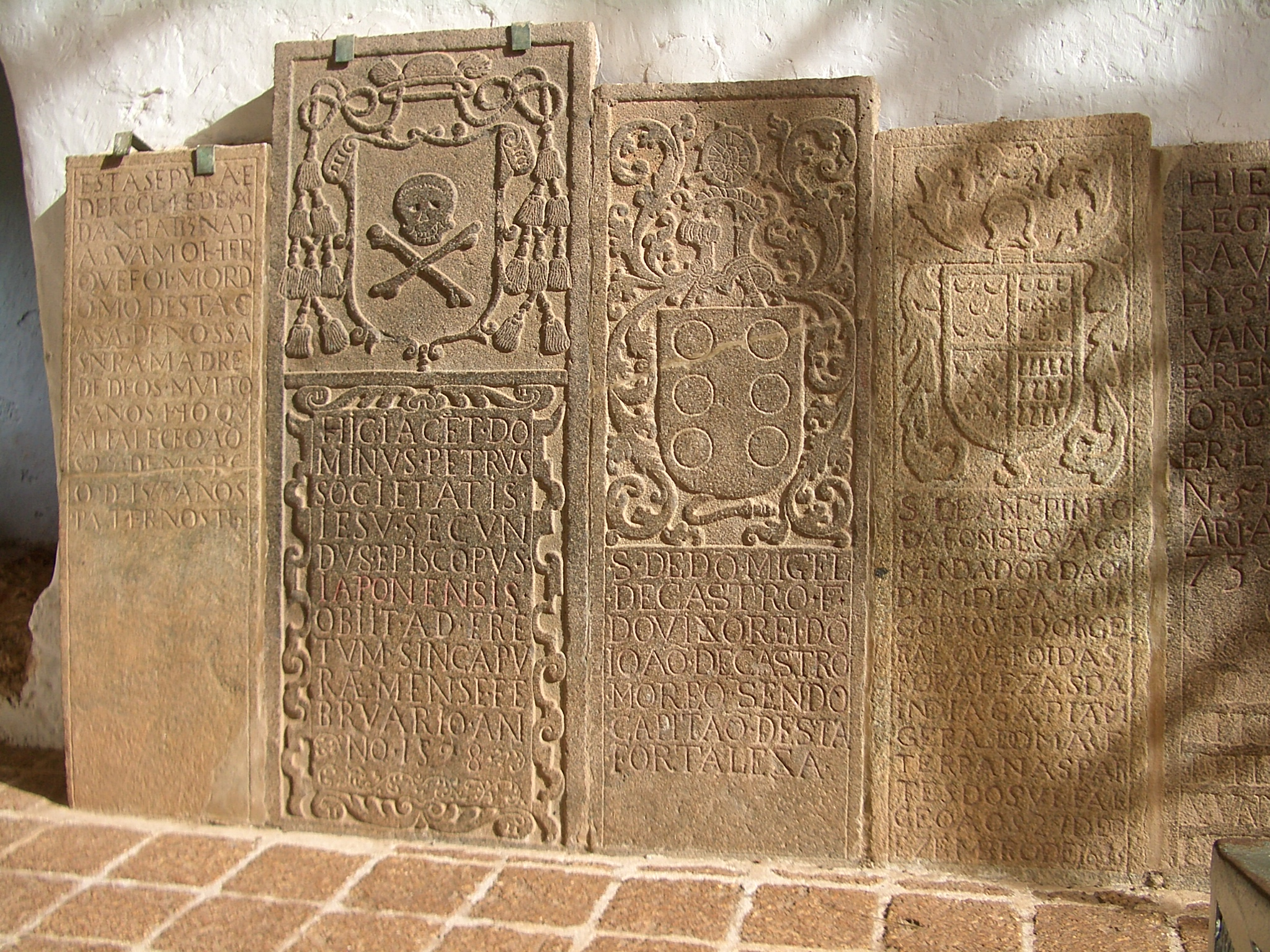
Old Portuguese tombstones in the church

Efforts to preserve records of monuments from the past such as the tombstones found in St. Paul's Church were photographed by Robert Norman Bland, resident councillor of Malacca, and published in his 1905 work Historical Tombstones of Malacca.

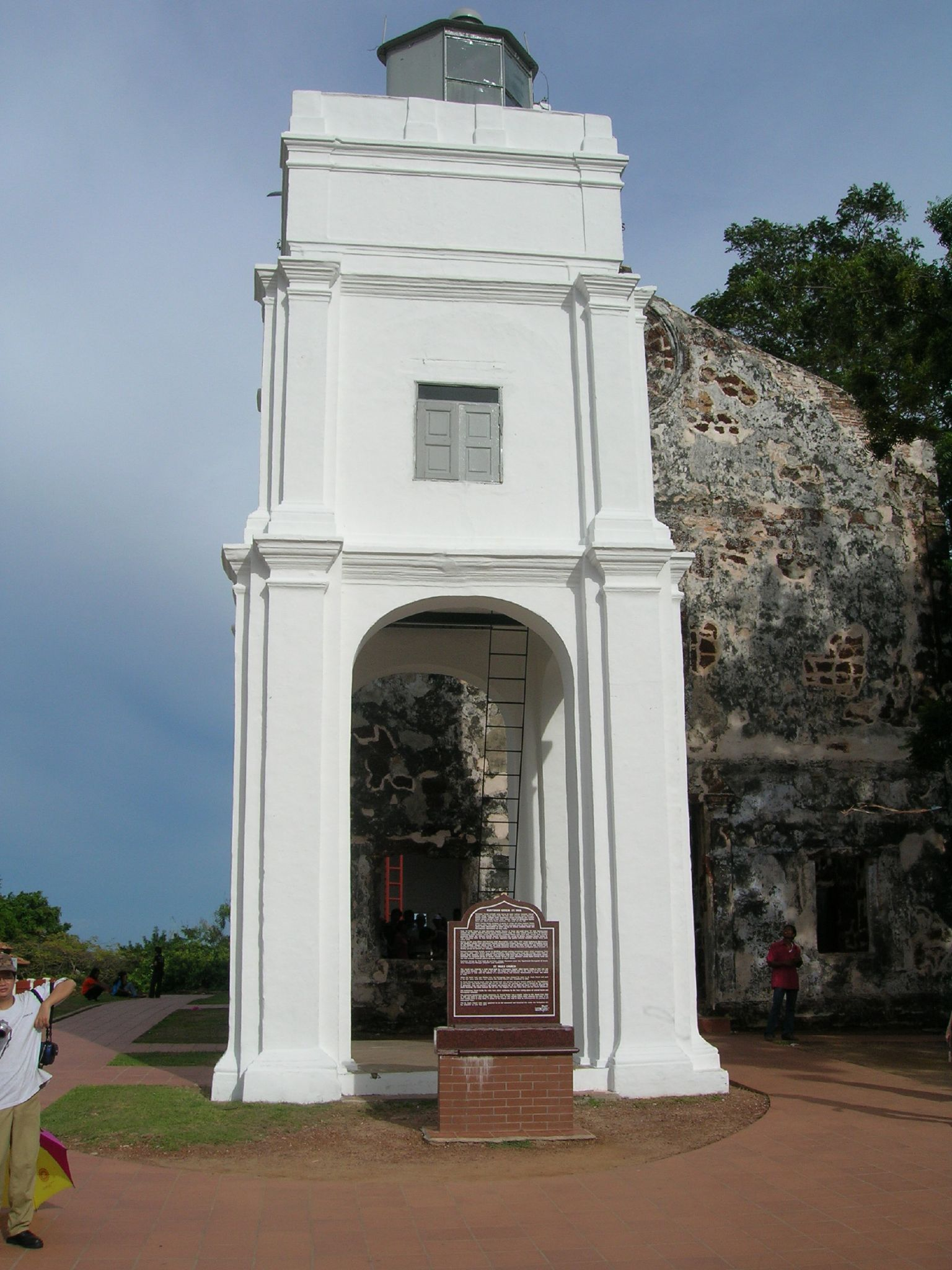
Now-defunct lighthouse

In 1814, William Farquhar built a lighthouse in front of the church. This consists mainly of a lantern and gallery mounted on an arched base and is solely accessible from ground level via a small ladder. It is an approximately 13-metre (43 feet) high, three-storey square white tower, which adopted basic elements from neoclassical architecture with no outbuildings, assuming an angular form different from many of its cylindrical and cone shaped counterparts throughout the region.

In 1924, the old Portuguese burial vault in the chancel of the church was partially uncovered. Further excavation was done in 1930 by the president of the newly formed Malacca Historical Society, Major C. E. Bone.

In 1932 tombstones that were scattered around in the vicinity of the church were aligned along the walls and the main door of the church as reopened.

In 1953, a statue of St. Francis Xavier was erected in front of the ruins of the church in commemoration of the 400th anniversary of his sojourn in Malacca. The statue is missing its right hand. Sources differ as to how the statue came to lose this limb: one local legend has it that the statue's arm was broken due to being struck by lightning. Another source mentions that the day after the statue was consecrated, a large casuarina tree fell on it, breaking off its right arm. This explanation is likely to be inaccurate, as the statue is shown with both arms intact in a 1961 documentary by Filem Negara Malaysia (now FINAS). A Straits Times article from 1967 reports that the fingers on the statue's right hand were taken by visitors in the belief that they could be used as lucky charms. Incidentally, the right forearm of Xavier was detached in 1614 as a relic.

== See also ==
- Roman Catholicism in Malaysia
- Portuguese Malacca
- List of Jesuit sites
