= Jan Samuel Timmerman Thijssen =

Dutch colonial administrator

Governor of Dutch Malacca
- In office 1818–1823
- Preceded by: William Farquhar (British Resident)
- Succeeded by: Adriaan Koek (acting)

Personal details
- Born: 1783
- Died: 15 January 1823 (aged 39–40)

Jan Samuel Timmerman Thijssen (1783 – 15 January 1823) was a Dutch trader who served as Governor of Malacca from 1818 to 1823.

== Early life ==
Jan Samuel Timmerman Thijssen was born in 1783 and became a leading Dutch merchant. Whilst in the Dutch East Indies he became a friend of Thomas Stamford Raffles, who was governor during the British occupation of Java from 1811 to 1816.

== Governor of Malacca ==
In 1818, he went to Malacca after the British agreed to allow the Dutch to retake possession of the town which the Dutch had previously captured from the Portuguese and held since 1641, it having been briefly relinquished to the British during the Napoleonic Wars (1803 to 1815). There he met British Resident William Farquhar, who handed over control of the town to Thijssen, as the head of the Dutch commissioners, and Thijssen was installed as the Governor of Malacca.

Thijssen soon restored Dutch trade in the Malay Peninsula. The Dutch were strongly opposed to the establishment of the new settlement by Raffles in Singapore in 1819 and, despite the friendship between the two men, Thijssen, during his governorship, threatened to send troops to capture the island. Eventually, in the year following the death of Thijssen, the Dutch returned Malacca to the British, and formally agreed to recognise Singapore as a British settlement under the terms of Article 12 of the Anglo-Dutch Treaty of 1824.

Whilst Governor of Malacca, Thijssen announced his intention to abolish slavery which had long existed in Malacca. An English translation of his speech was printed in the newspaper of the London Missionary Society published by British missionaries William Milne and Robert Morrison in January 1820 who were also advocating its abolition.

== Death ==
Thijssen died on 15 January 1823 whilst in office. The circumstances surrounding his death have never been established which has given rise to speculation as to the cause of death at age 40. No identifiable grave has been found.
