= Kota Supai =

Fort in Melaka, Malaysia

Fort Supai
- Kota Supai (in Malay)
- Alor Gajah, Malaysia

Site information
- Open to the public: Yes

Site history
- Built: 1757
- Built by: Dutch Malacca and Bugis
- In use: 1758-1759

Kota Supai or also known as Kota Meriam Patah and Kota Filipina is a defensive fort built by Dutch Malacca and Bugis in Kuala Linggi, Melaka, in August 1757.

== History ==
In 1756, war between Dutch Malacca and Bugis erupted. Dutch Malacca surrounded the Bugis troops, led by Daeng Kemboja at the Linggi River estuary. Trapped, the Bugis asked for peace. The Dutch were able to take Rembau and Kelang and the war ended in 1757.

The fort was built by Dutch Malacca and Bugis together to commemorate the end of their war. The peace treaty were then signed at the fort on 1 January 1758.

The fort that was built on top of Tanjung Bukit Supai, were used for enemy surveillance and tin tax collection.Sepoy were employed to guard the fort, causing the locals to call it Kota Supai.

A year later, the Dutch abandoned the fort.

== Structure ==
The fort is in rectangle shape, measuring 167 feet by 150 feet. The walls is eight feet height and have two entrance. There is four cannon with two were positioned towards the land while another two facing towards the Straits of Melaka. At the top of the fort, there is an open field surrounded by rocks acting as walls.

After the fort was abandoned, the cannon were being left rotten. Five replica have been made and put around the fort.
