= William Farquhar =

Madras Army officer and colonial administrator (1774–1839)

The Honourable William Farquhar
- Portrait by John Graham-Gilbert, c. 1828

Resident of Malacca
- In office 1803–1818
- Monarch: George III
- Preceded by: Willem Jacob Cranssen
- Succeeded by: Jan Samuel Timmerman Thijssen

Resident of Singapore
- In office 6 February 1819 – 1 May 1823
- Appointed by: Stamford Raffles
- Monarchs: George III; George IV
- Preceded by: Position established
- Succeeded by: John Crawfurd

Personal details
- Born: 26 February 1774 Newhall, Aberdeenshire
- Died: 11 May 1839 (aged 65) Perth, Scotland
- Resting place: Greyfriars Burial Ground
- Spouse: Margaret Loban (m. 1828–1839)
- Domestic partner: Antoinette Clement (1795–1823)
- Children: with Antoinette Clement: at least 6; with Margaret Loban: 6
- Parents: Robert Farquhar (father); Agnes Morrison (mother)
- Relatives: Arthur Farquhar (brother); Margaret (Sinclair) Trudeau (4x great-granddaughter); Justin Trudeau (5x great-grandson); Alexandre Trudeau (5x great-grandson); Michel Trudeau (5x great-grandson)
- Occupation: Army officer, colonial administrator

Military service
- Allegiance: East India Company
- Branch/service: Madras Army
- Years of service: 1791–1839
- Rank: Major general
- Unit: Madras Pioneers
- Battles/wars: Napoleonic Wars; Invasion of Java (1811)

Major-General William Farquhar (26 February 1774 – 11 May 1839) was a Madras Army officer and colonial administrator who served as the resident of Malacca from 1803 to 1818 and the resident of Singapore from 1819 to 1823.

== Early life ==
Farquhar was born in Newhall, Aberdeenshire, near Aberdeen, in 1774 as the youngest child of Robert Farquhar and Agnes Morrison, his father's second wife. His brother, Arthur, two years his senior, rose to the rank of rear admiral in the Royal Navy, and received a knighthood for his distinguished services during the Napoleonic Wars. Shortly after arriving in Madras on 19 June 1791, Farquhar joined the Madras Army of the East India Company as a cadet at the age of 17. He was commissioned as an ensign in the Madras Pioneers on 22 June 1791 and was promoted to lieutenant on 16 August 1793.

== Malacca ==
Between 1795 and 1813 Farquhar was the chief administrator of British-occupied Malacca. He was also the chief engineer in the British expeditionary force which captured Malacca from the Dutch on 18 August 1795. Farquhar spoke Malay and was popularly known as the ‘Rajah of Malacca’.

On 1 January 1803 Farquhar was promoted to captain. During his tenure in Malacca he assisted in missions around the region, including the British invasion of Java led by Governor-General of India Lord Minto and Sir Stamford Raffles in August 1811. Farquhar was promoted to major on 26 September 1812 and appointed as the Resident of Malacca in December 1813. He was put in charge of both civil and military offices until the Dutch returned in September 1818.

An engineer, his reputation was established by his long and successful term as Resident of Malacca, of which he was given charge when it passed into British hands from the Dutch. A task given him by the British government was to demolish all the structures left by the former occupants; he blew up the fortifications with gunpowder but spared some of the other buildings, showing great intelligence. While still in Malacca, Farquhar learnt the Malay language and married a local Malay woman.

== Singapore ==
With his long Malayan experience and an intimate knowledge of Riau-Lingga politics, Major Farquhar proposed a settlement on Singapore island. He negotiated the provisional agreement of 30 January 1819 with the local chieftain Temenggong Abdul Rahman; and the more formal Singapore Treaty of 6 February 1819, which was signed with the Temenggong and the Sultan Hussein Mohammed Shah, confirming the right for the British to set up a trading post. On the same day, Farquhar, accompanied by a few Malaccan Malays, had to climb up the hill, known as the Bukit Larangan. He drew up the first gun and set up the post to hoist the Union Jack flag on top of the hill, marking the birth of Singapore as a British settlement.

Farquhar then became the first Resident of Singapore to develop the colony according to a provisional plan that he had drawn up. Farquhar continued to manage the colony in the four years until Raffles came to review progress. In his new post, he quickly set about clearing the plain on the northeast bank of the Singapore River. His son-in-law Captain Francis James Bernard was appointed as Master Attendant to control shipping. Word of this new trading post soon spread and Singapore became a thriving cosmopolitan town. Farquhar even took the decision to legalize gambling, and the sale of opium and alcohol. This was with Raffles' approval and necessary to help curb crime. With crimes thriving in the area, Farquhar then established the first police force in May 1820 and his son-in-law Bernard led as the Police Assistant. Farquhar would only receive official sanction from Raffles three months later in August 1820. Communication with Raffles in British Bencoolen and East India Company authorities in Calcutta were so poor that for more than three years Singapore developed on her own with Farquhar at the helm.

On 9 May 1821 Farquhar was promoted to lieutenant colonel. Despite his many positive achievements in the formative period of Singapore's development, he adopted measures in his administration that conflicted with Raffles' ideas, notably in allowing the erection of houses and godowns on the Padang and on the nearby banks of the Singapore River. His justification was that in the rapidly expanding settlement 'nothing is heard in the shape of complaint but the want of more ground to build on'. When Raffles returned in October 1822 he was furious to discover his ideas had been neglected. He then illegally dismissed Farquhar, who first refused to leave and later sued Raffles for tyrannical behaviour.

=== Assassination attempt ===
On 11 March 1823 as Farquhar walked into his garden an Arab named Sayid Yasin stabbed him with a kris. Sayid was prevented from completing his task only by the timely arrival of Farquhar's son Andrew who killed him immediately. The stabbing was not fatal.

The European settlers assumed immediately that Sayid must have been acting in the name of the Temenggong Abdul Rahman, but that was not true. Sayid was angry at Francis Bernard who had sent him to jail, but his attack on Farquhar was accidental. Raffles argued that an attack on an official should be met with an exemplary punishment and called for Sayid's corpse to be put in chains in an iron cage and exhibited publicly at Tanjong Malang for a fortnight. Sayid's grave at Tanjong Pagar, however, would soon become a shrine and remained a place of pilgrimage for many years, making many Europeans think that Raffles had endangered their lives by needlessly antagonizing the Malays.

== Departure from Southeast Asia ==
The conflicts which arose during Raffles' final stay in Singapore led to Farquhar's dismissal on 1 May 1823, to be succeeded as Resident by Dr John Crawfurd without the knowledge of Farquhar himself. He remained in Singapore after that for a few months. At a farewell dinner with the principal merchants and British inhabitants on 27 December 1823, Farquhar was presented with a plate valued at 3,000 rupees as a farewell gift. The Chinese community of the settlement gifted Farquhar with an ornate silver epergne bearing crests, a Latin inscription, and the hallmark "1825". Shortly after, he finally departed from Singapore for Malacca, Penang and Calcutta en route back home to England. Farquhar's popularity with the Asian and the European community of Singapore was attested to by Munshi Abdullah Abdul Kadir, in his Hikayat Abdullah.

One example was the moving account of Farquhar's departure from Singapore at the end of December 1823, which was confirmed by a report in one of Calcutta's newspapers, which states that on that day as he left, he was accompanied to the beach by most of the European inhabitants of the settlement as well as by 'a large concourse' of Asians of every class. As a compliment to him, the troops formed a guard-of-honour from his house to the landing place, and he embarked with the customary salute to his rank. Then many Asian boats accompanied him to his ship, the Alexander, and as they sailed, some of the Siamese vessels fired salutes to him. Similar welcomes and tributes also awaited him up the Straits, in Malacca and in Penang.

== Further dispute with Raffles ==
After his arrival in London in 1824, Farquhar wrote to the Court of Directors of the East India Company, complained of his unjust removal from office by Raffles, and requested the reinstatement of his command of Singapore. He described Singapore as "a settlement formed at his own suggestion and matured under his personal management", and asked the Directors to "appreciate those feelings of interest excited in his mind in regard to a Settlement selected and founded by himself."

When the Directors referred this Memorial to Raffles, he dismissed Farquhar's claim as peremptorily as he had dismissed Farquhar from office in April 1823. Raffles replied: "On the credit assumed by Lieutenant-Colonel Farquhar for having suggested the establishment of Singapore, this is the first time I ever heard of the circumstance, and on reference to the public records I find nothing to support it. A regard to truth compels me to deny in broad terms that Colonel Farquhar ever suggested, or, to my knowledge, knew or stated anything with regard to the formation of a Settlement at Singapore, until I communicated to him the authority with which I was invested, to form a Settlement there."

In Farquhar's brief rejoinder to Raffles' reply, in April 1825, he omitted reference to Singapore and to his claim, and the Court of Directors finally ruled against him in November 1825, refusing his request to be reinstated. Raffles commented in a letter to his sister: "It was my wish poor Man that he should be let off as easily as possible, but he seems to have failed in all he attempted, and if he has not been so severely handled as he might have been he has me to thank for it -- for certainly he stands on no better footing than he did before he made his Appeal."

== Retirement ==
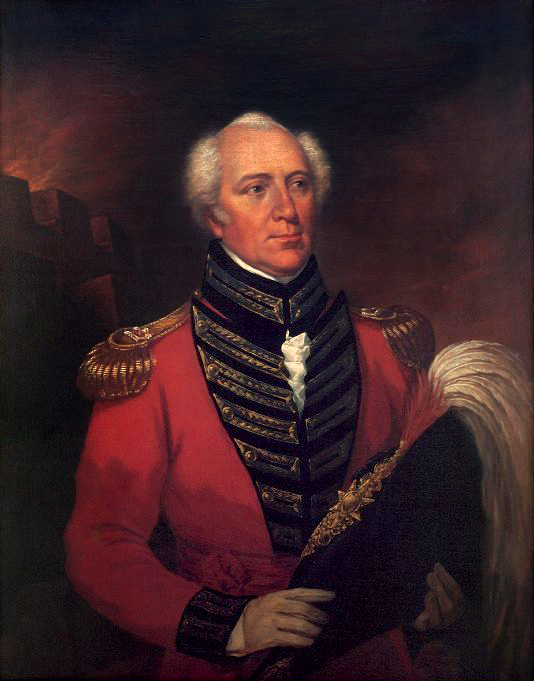
c. 1830 portrait of Farquhar

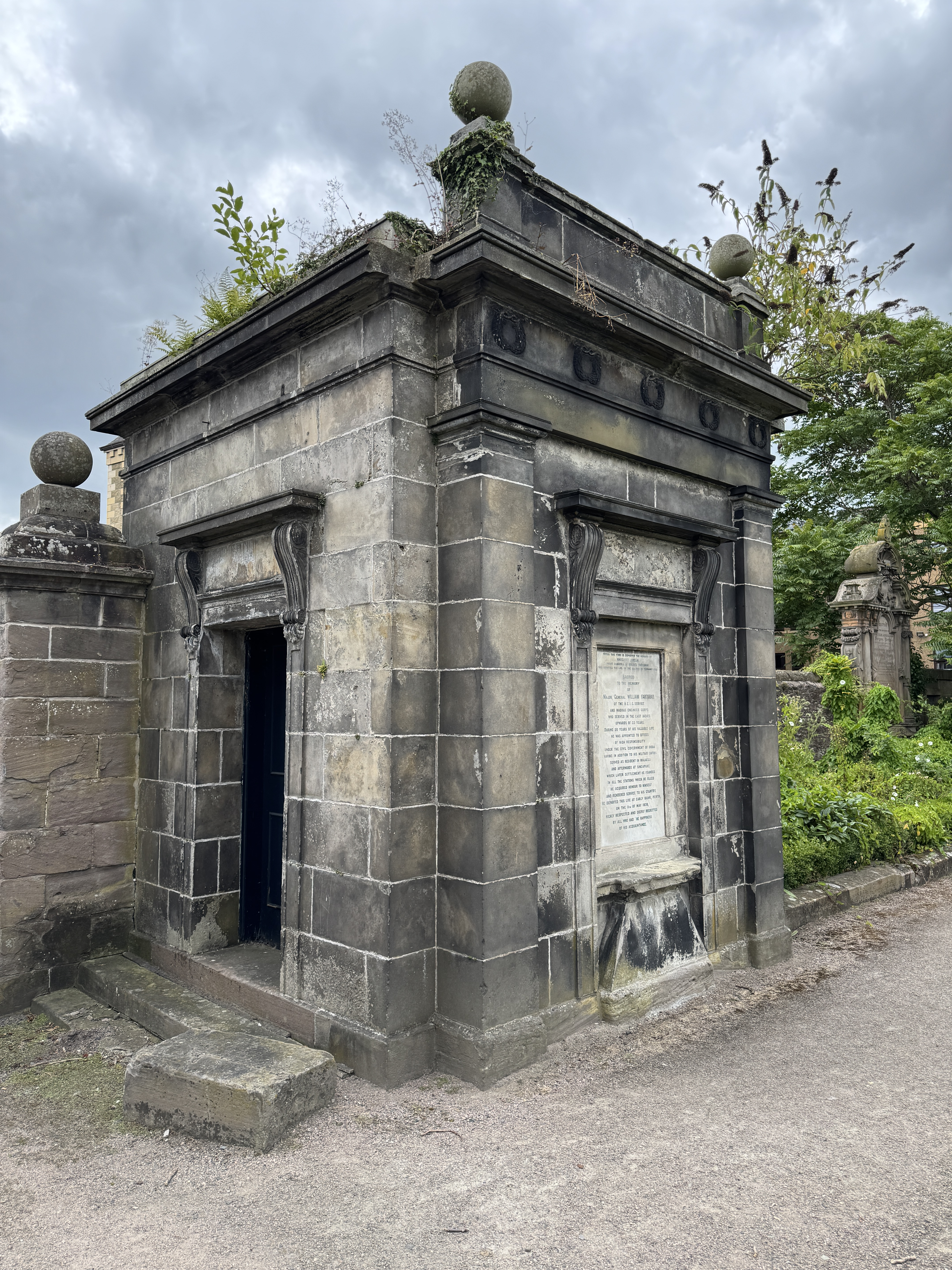
Farquhar's tomb at the Greyfriars Burial Ground

Farquhar settled in Perth, Scotland, in late 1826, where he bought two large recently completed Georgian houses (one for his brothers, a naval captain) and built a billiard hall for the entertainment of his many friends. In 1829 Farquhar was promoted to colonel, and in the next year he challenged certain statements made by Sophia Raffles, the widow of Stamford Raffles who had died on 5 July 1826, in her book Memoir of the life and public services of Sir Thomas Stamford Raffles, particularly in the government of Java, 1811-1816, and of Bencoolen and its dependencies, 1817-1824. He asserted that "She very modestly and candidly allows (her late husband) the sole and exclusive merit of having established and brought into commercial importance the new settlement of Singapore, which is styled his Settlement."

Farquhar published an article in which he contended that he had "at least a large share in forming that establishment" and that, having stated all the circumstances, he would "leave the public to judge on whether Lady Raffles can fairly claim for her husband the sole and exclusive merit of having formed the settlement of Singapore." On 17 August 1833, Farquhar drafted the Deed of Settlement for his former mistress Antoinette "Nonio" Clement, to whom he bequeathed his house and contents in Kampong Glam, together with an annuity of sp350 paid half yearly in advance. In 1837 Farquhar was promoted to his final rank of major general.

== Natural history drawings ==
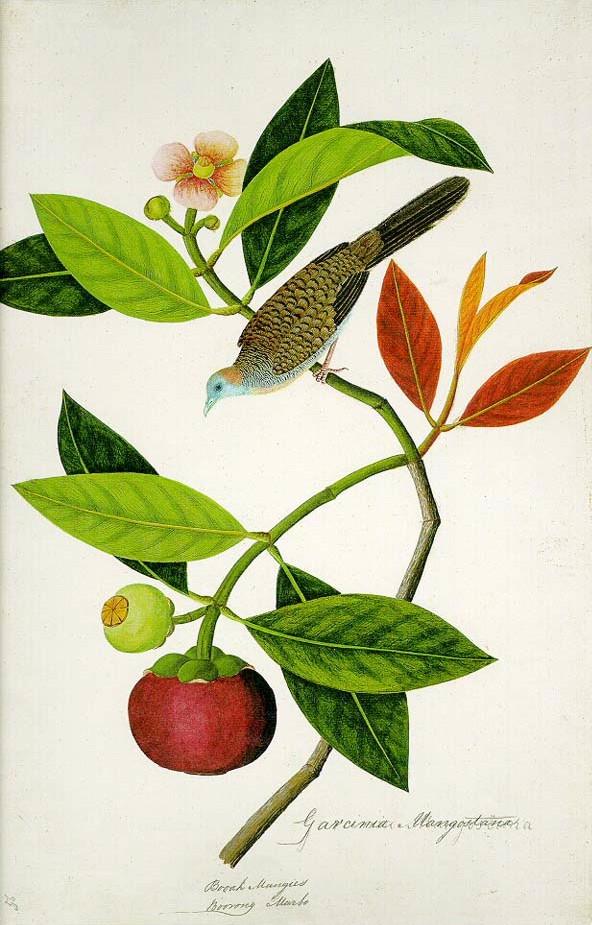
A watercolour drawing of a zebra dove (Geopelia striata) perched on a mangosteen tree (Garcinia mangostana), from the William Farquhar collection of natural history drawings

Between 1819 and 1823 Farquhar commissioned unidentified Chinese artists to illustrate local flora and fauna. This project resulted in 477 watercolours of plants, mammals, birds, reptiles, fish and insects found in Malacca and Singapore. These paintings played a pivotal role in revealing the region's biodiversity to Western naturalists, and are interesting in their blending of the stylised oriental manner with the realism of western art.

The William Farquhar Collection of Natural History Drawings, showing 141 of these illustrations, was published in 1999. A volume containing prints of all 477 works in the Farquhar collection was published by Editions Didier Millet and the National Museum of Singapore in 2010.

== Personal life and death ==
Farquhar kept a Malaccan-French mistress, Antoinette "Nonio" Clement, with whom he had at least six children, one of which died while still an infant. Their eldest daughter Esther Farquhar would marry Captain Francis James Bernard who became a prominent part of early Singapore. Farquhar married Margaret Loban on 7 April 1828, and had six children with her, including one daughter who died in infancy.

Farquhar died on 11 May 1839 at age 65 in his home, Early Banks, in Perth, Scotland. He has a mausoleum in Greyfriars Burial Ground, Perth. On his tomb, there is the following inscription in block capitals: "Sacred to the Memory of Major General William Farquhar of the H.E.I.C. Service and Madras Engineer Corps who served in the East Indies upwards of 33 years. During 20 years of his valuable life he was appointed to offices of high responsibility under the civil government of India having in addition to his military duties served as Resident in Malacca and afterwards at Singapore which later settlement he founded. In all the stations which he filled he acquired honour to himself and rendered service to his country. He departed this life at Early Bank, Perth, on the 11th of May 1839, highly respected and deeply regretted by all who had the happiness of his acquaintance."

== Legacy ==
Farquhar Street, a former street in Singapore, was named after him. This street was located in the Kampong Glam area between Beach Road and North Bridge Road. It was expunged in 1994 due to street realignment and no longer exists.

Lebuh Farquhar (Farquhar Street) in Penang, Malaysia, is mistakenly thought to be named after him. It is actually named after Robert Townsend Farquhar (no relation), Lieutenant General of Penang from 1804-05.

In 1993, the silver epergne William Farquhar received from the Chinese community before his departure from Singapore on 27 December 1823, was acquired by the National Museum of Singapore from his descendant, Captain David John Farquhar Atkins, for S$52,000.

Through his eldest daughter Esther Asther Bernard, née Farquhar, Farquhar is a fifth great-grandfather of Justin Trudeau, the 23rd Prime Minister of Canada, and fourth great-grandfather of Margaret Trudeau, onetime wife of Pierre Elliott Trudeau, the 15th Prime Minister of Canada.

== Sources ==
- Brazil, David. Insider's Singapore. Singapore: Times Books International, 2001. National Resource Library.

Political offices
Preceded by Willem Jacob Cranssen as Governor of Malacca	Resident of Malacca; 1808–1818	Succeeded by Jan Samuel Timmerman Thijssen as Governor of Malacca
New creation	Resident of Singapore; 1819 – 1823	Succeeded by John Crawfurd
