= St. Paul's Hill =

Hill in Malacca City, Malacca, Malaysia

Coordinates: 2°11′34.8″N 102°14′58.1″E

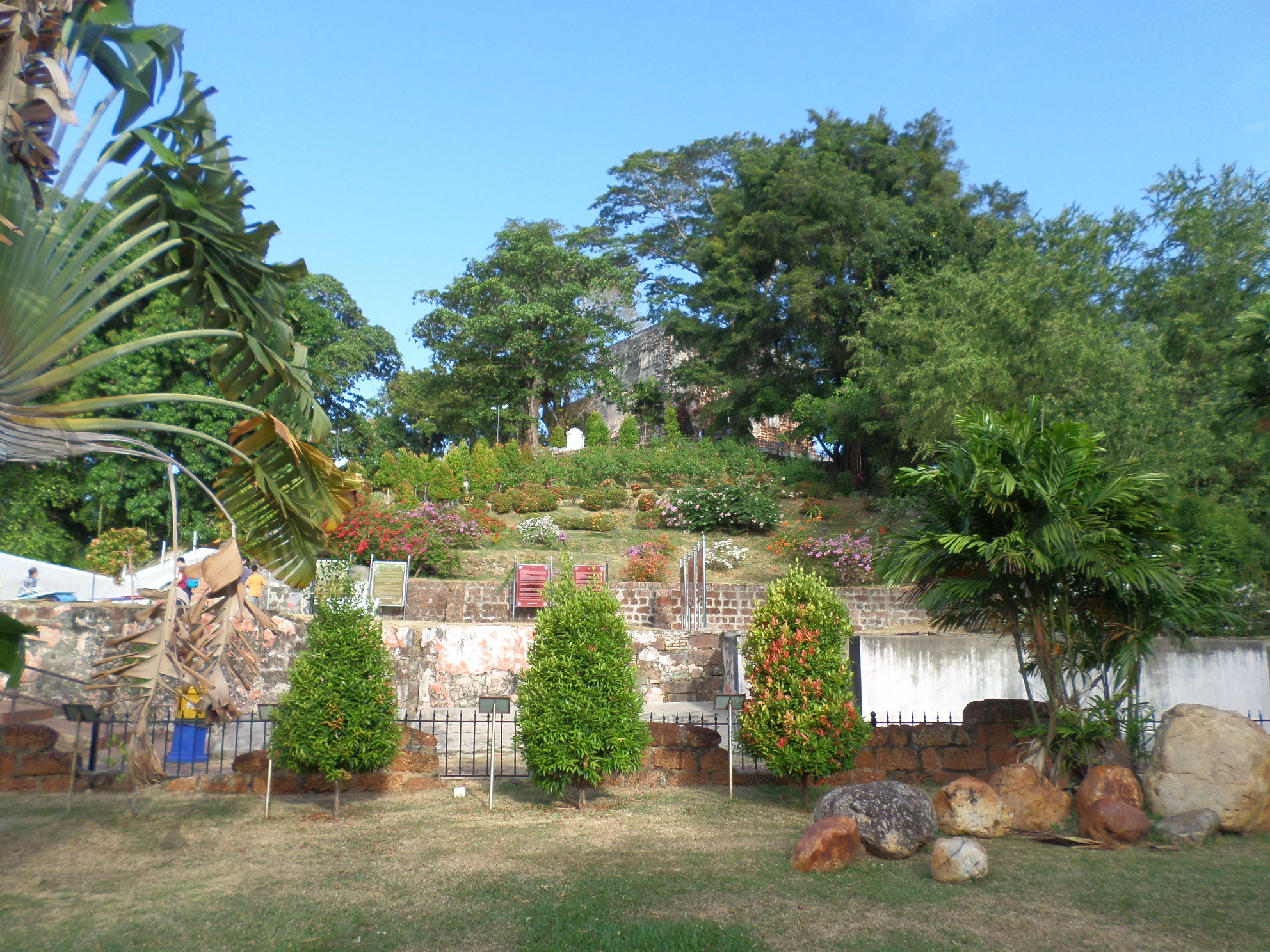
St. Paul's Hill

St. Paul's Hill (Malay: Bukit St. Paul) is a hill in Malacca City, Malacca, Malaysia. It was originally known as Malacca Hill (Malay: Bukit Melaka) during the Sultanate period and Mary's Hill during the Portuguese period.

== Features ==
Image	Name	Description
	Democratic Government Museum (Malay: Muzium Pemerintahan Demokrasi)	A museum about the development and practice of parliamentary democracy in Malaysia, it was formerly the Malacca State Legislative Assembly building, which was moved to Ayer Keroh as its present location since February 2000.
	The Dutch Graveyard (Malay: Kubur Belanda)	A graveyard first used in the last quarter of 17th century and used in two stages, in which the first one was in 1670–1682 by the Dutch themselves and the second one in 1818–1838 by the British. A total of 5 Dutch officers and 33 British officers and their spouses were buried there.
	Governor's Museum (Malay: Muzium Yang di-Pertua Negeri)	A museum which exhibits the personal belongings of various governors of Malacca since the independence of Malaya. Its building was formerly used as the official residence and office of the Dutch Governor of Malacca and also the official residence of the Yang di-Pertua Negeri of Malacca named Seri Melaka from independence until September 1996, when it was turned into a museum and officially opened to the public in 2002.
	Malacca Literature Museum (Malay: Muzium Sastera Melaka)	Officiated by Chief Minister Mohd Zin Abdul Ghani in 1984, it is a museum which displays Malaysian literary works from the Malacca Sultanate period to contemporary Malaysia, such as written history of Malacca, the writings of Munsyi Abdullah, local Malay folklore and the laws of the Malacca Sultanate. The museum's building was believed to be formerly an officer residence during the British colonial era, a criminal detention room during the Japanese occupation era and was the Malacca State Development Corporation headquarters from 1974 until 1984. Graphical panels, exhibition boxes, audio visual and kiosk information are some of the techniques used to display the items in the museum. A mural that depicts of evolution of literature composition in Malaysia from the use of stone tablets to computer and keyboard is displayed in front of the museum.
	Church of St. Paul	A historic church building that was originally built in 1521 and dedicated to Virgin Mary, making it the oldest of its kind in Malaysia and Southeast Asia.

== Gallery ==
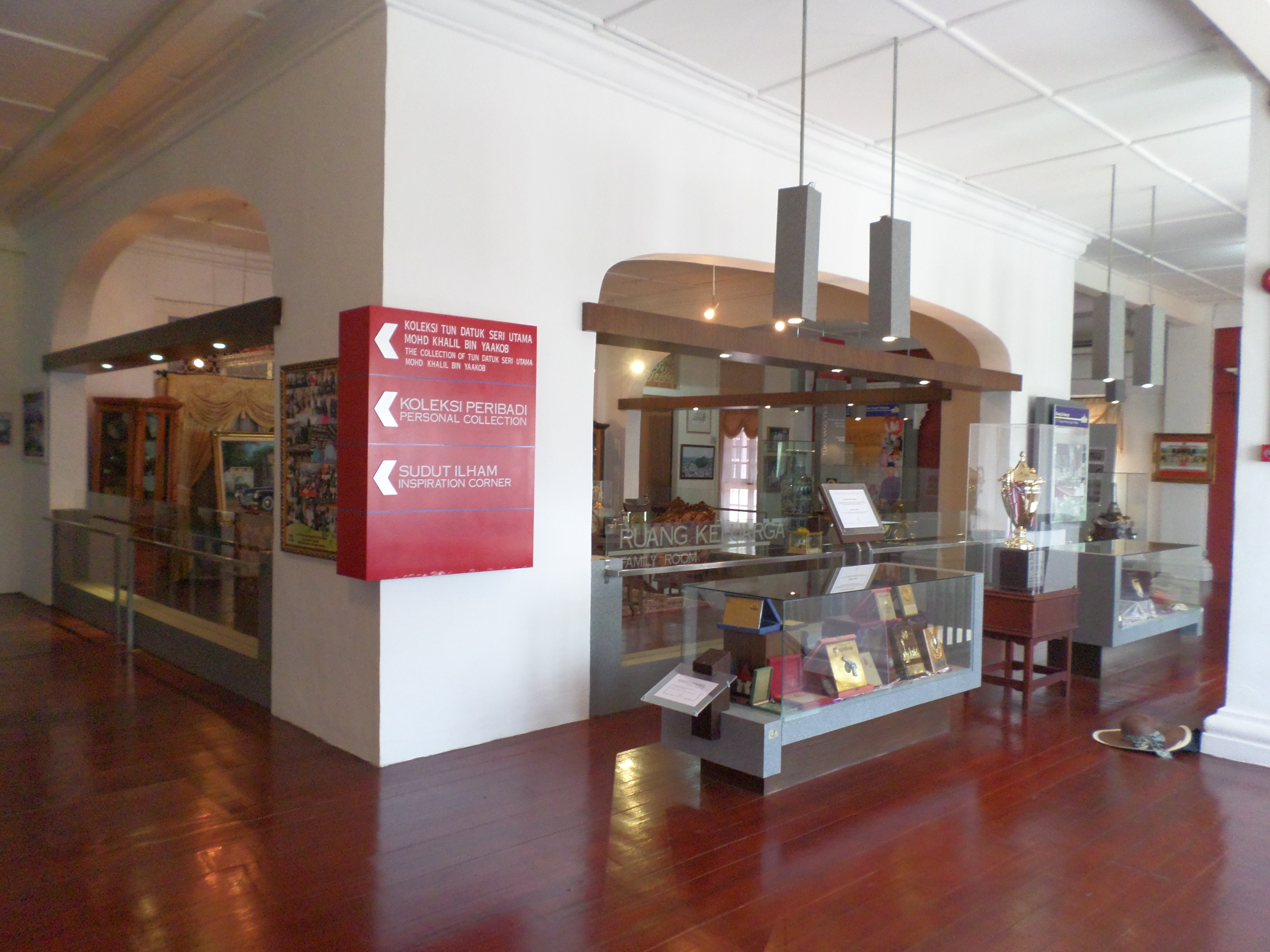
Governor's Museum exhibition hall

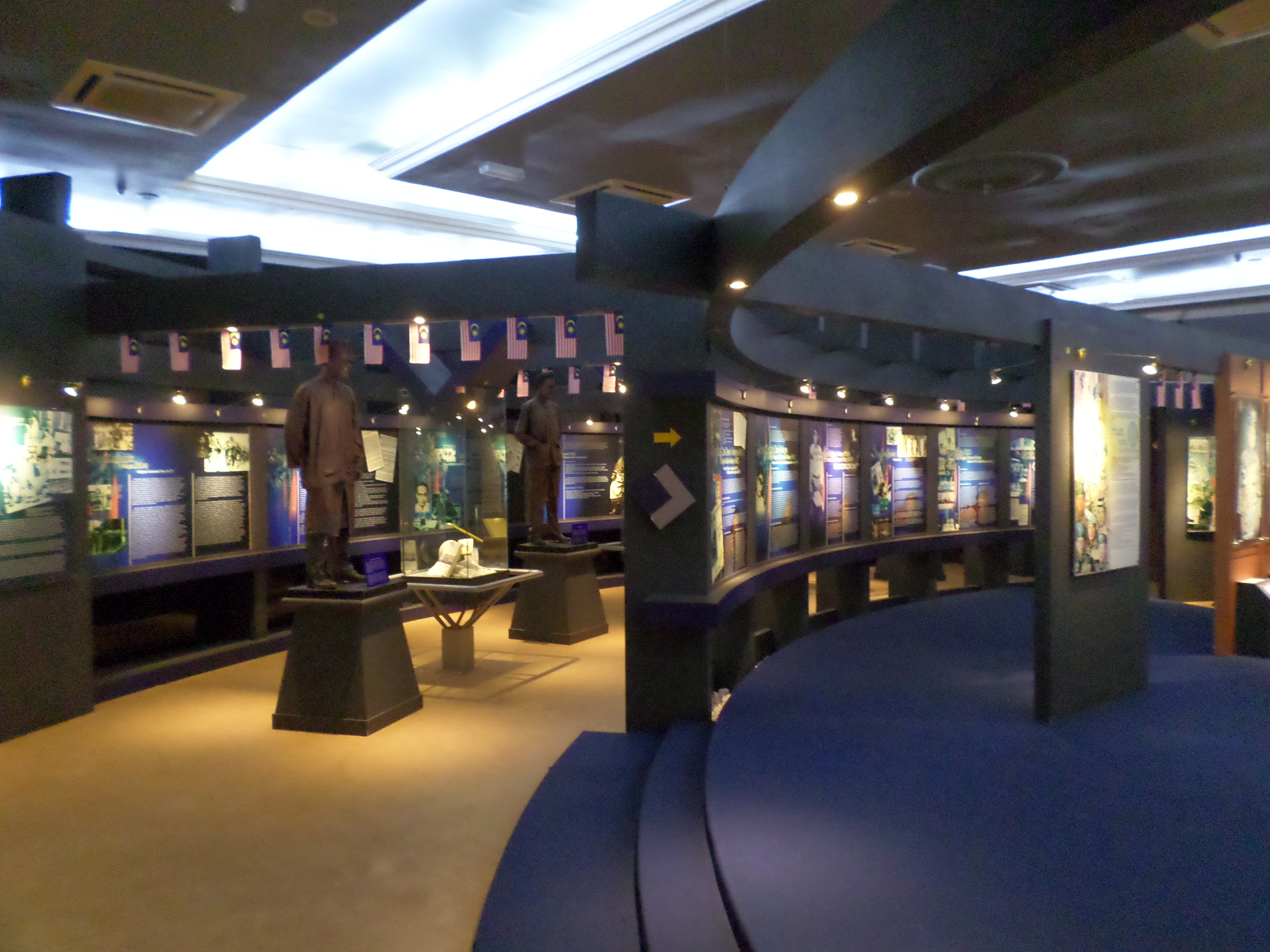
Democratic Government Museum exhibition hall

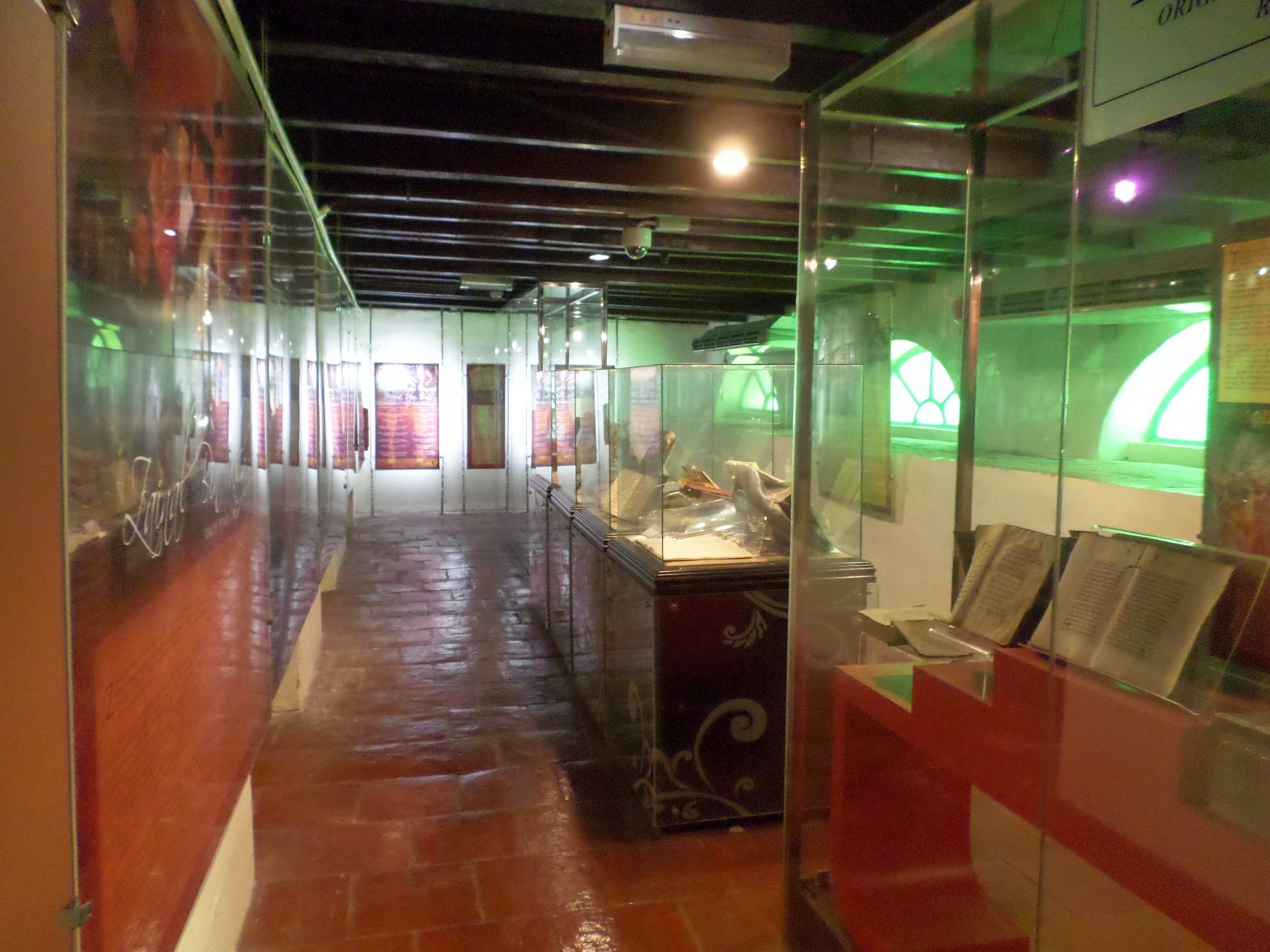
Malacca Literature Museum exhibition hall

== See also ==
- Geography of Malaysia
- List of tourist attractions in Malacca
