= Dutch Malacca =

History of Malacca under Dutch control (1641–1825)

Coordinates: 2°11′20″N 102°23′4″E

Governorate of Malacca Gouvernement Malacca (Dutch) Melaka Belanda (Malay)
- 1641–1795; 1818–1825
- Flag until 1795 Coat of arms
- Anthem: Wien Neêrlands Bloed (1818–1825)
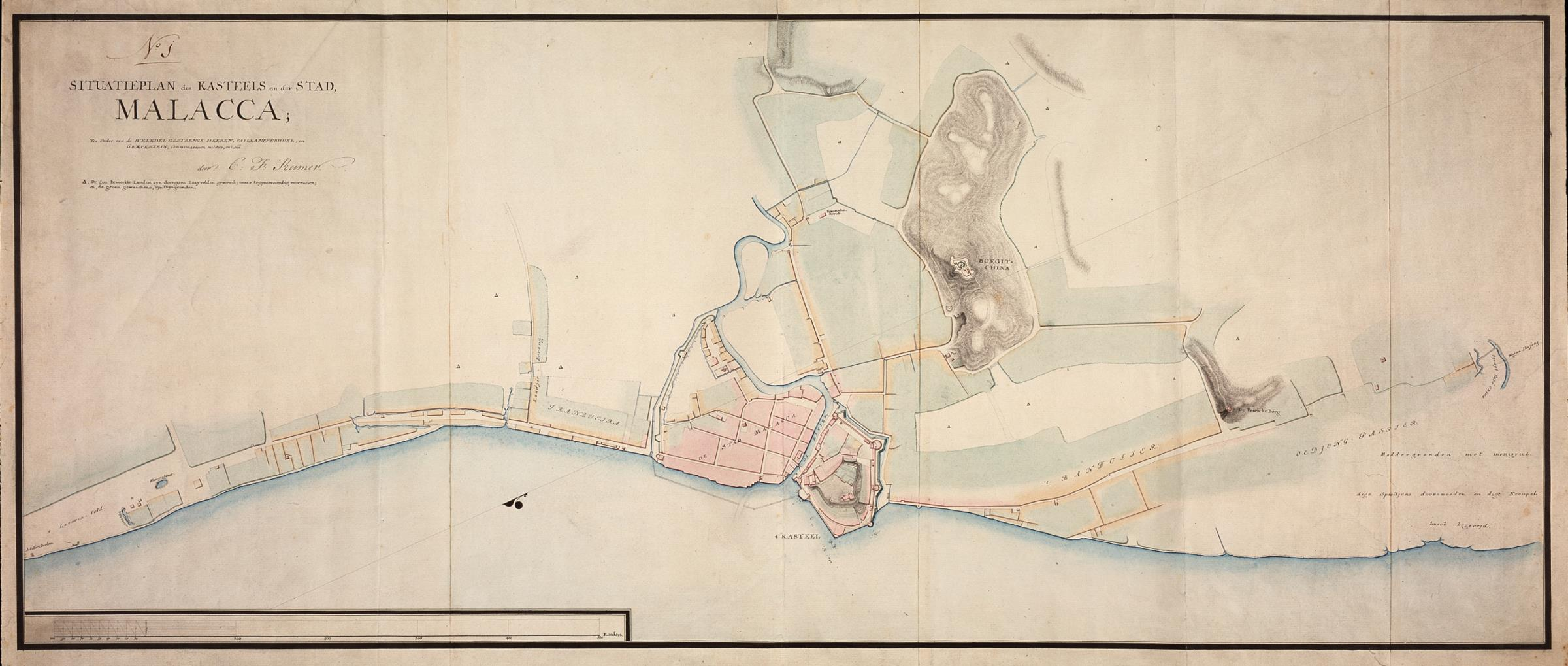
- Malacca between 1750 and 1796

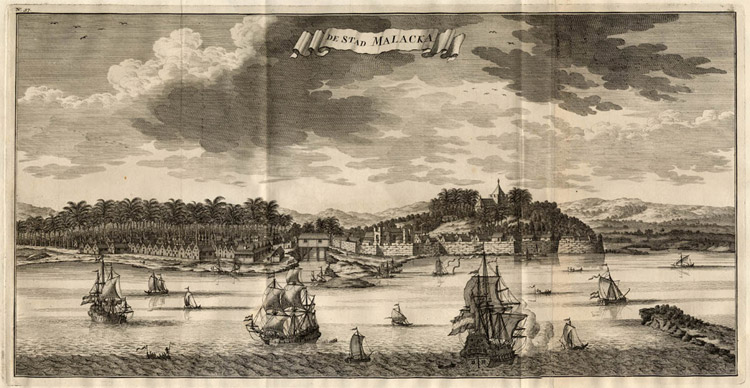
- Dutch Malacca, ca. 1724–26
- Status: Colony of the Dutch East India Company (1641–1795); Part of the Dutch East Indies (1818–1825)
- Capital: Malacca Town
- Common languages: Dutch, Malay
- Governor
  - 1641–42: Jan van Twist
  - 1824–25: Hendrik S. van Son
- British Resident
  - 1795: Archibald Brown
  - 1803–18: William Farquhar
- Historical era: Imperialism
  - Established: 14 January 1641
  - British occupation: 1795–1818
  - Relinquished by treaty: 1 March 1825
Preceded by	Succeeded by
Portuguese Malacca	Straits Settlements

Governorate of Malacca Gouvernement Malacca
- Governorates of Dutch East Indies
- 1818–1825
- Flag

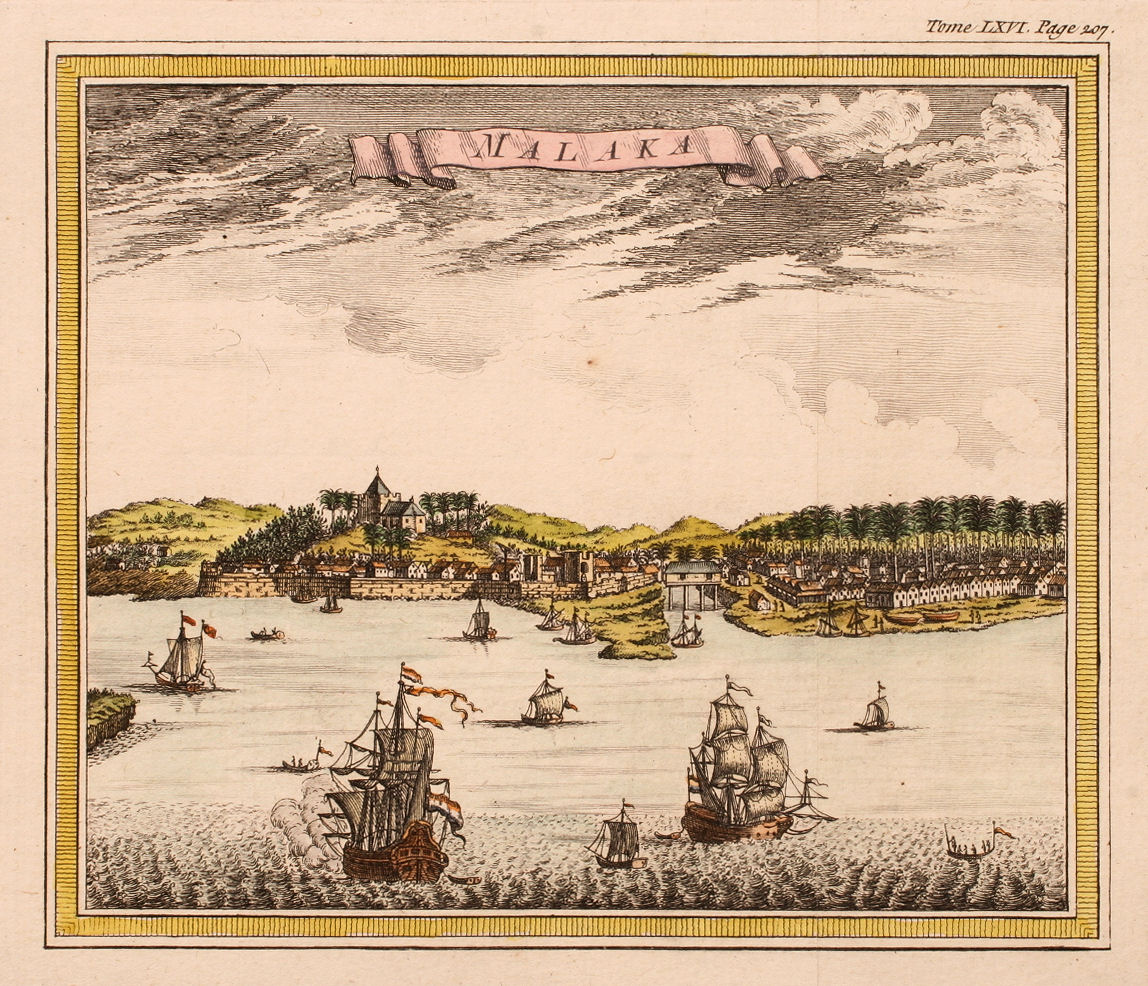
- Map of the governorate of Malacca.
- Capital: Malacca Town
- History
  - Established: 1818
  - Relinquished by treaty: 1 March 1825
Succeeded by
Straits Settlements
- Today part of: Malacca, Malaysia

Dutch Malacca (1641–1825) was the longest period that Malacca was under foreign control. The Dutch ruled for almost 183 years with intermittent British occupation during the French Revolutionary and later the Napoleonic Wars (1795–1815). This era saw relative peace with little serious interruption from the Malay sultanates due to the understanding forged between the Dutch and the Sultanate of Johor in 1606. This period also marked the decline of Malacca's importance. The Dutch preferred Batavia (present-day Jakarta) as their economic and administrative centre in the region and their hold in Malacca was to prevent the loss of the city to other European powers and, subsequently, the competition that would come with it. Thus, in the 17th century, with Malacca ceasing to be an important port, the Johor Sultanate became the dominant local power in the region due to the opening of its ports and the alliance with the Dutch.

== History ==
=== Dutch conquest of Portuguese Malacca ===
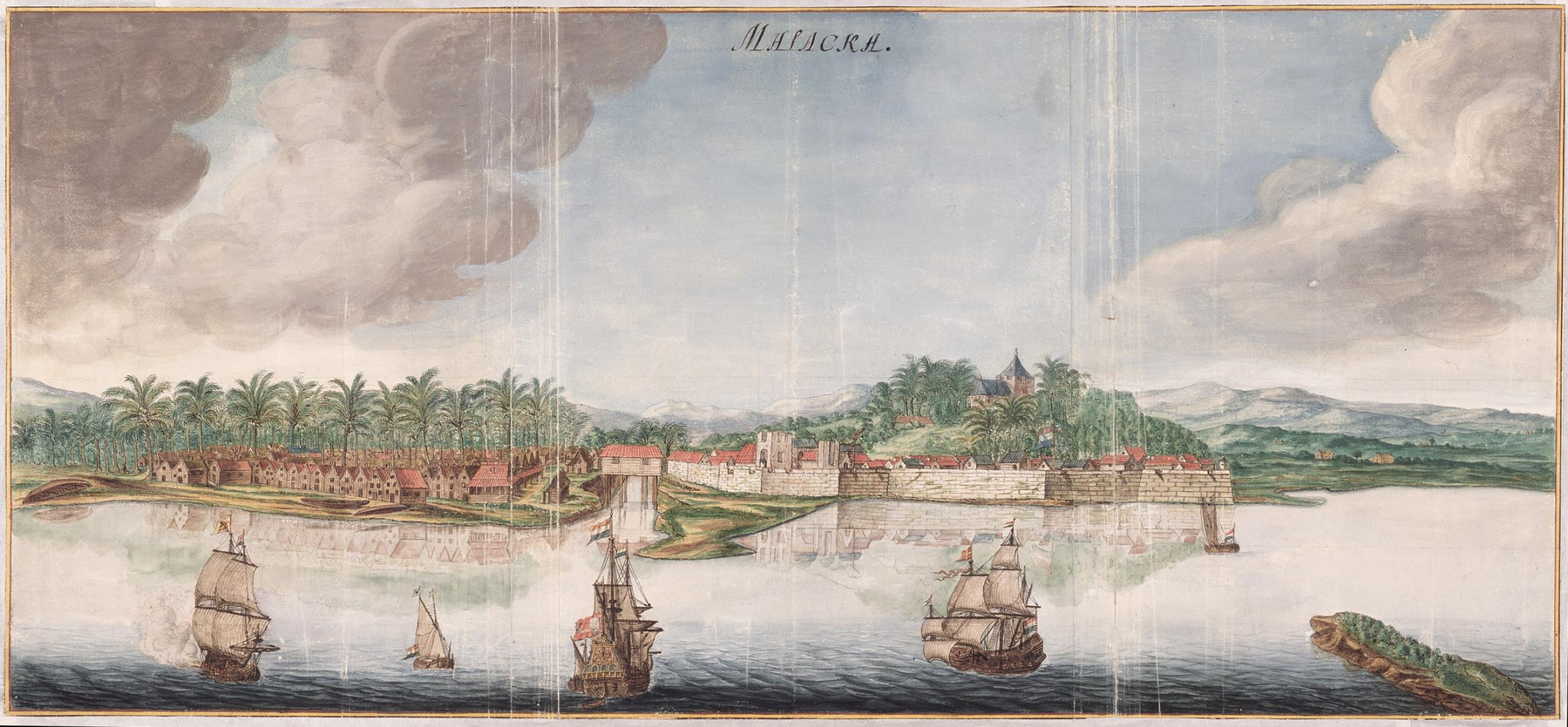
Dutch Malacca, ca. 1665

In the early 17th century, the Dutch East India Company (Dutch: Verenigde Oostindische Compagnie, VOC) began a campaign to usurp Portuguese power in the East. At that time, the Portuguese had transformed Malacca into an impregnable fortress (the Fortaleza de Malaca), controlling access to the sea lanes of the Strait of Malacca and the spice trade there. The Dutch started by launching small incursions and skirmishes against the Portuguese. The first serious attempt was the siege of Malacca in 1606 by the third VOC fleet from the Dutch Republic with eleven ships, under Admiral Cornelis Matelief de Jonge that led to the naval battle of Cape Rachado. Although the Dutch were routed, the Portuguese fleet of Martim Afonso de Castro, the Viceroy of Goa, suffered heavier casualties and the battle rallied the forces of the Sultanate of Johor in an alliance with the Dutch and later on with the Acehnese.

The Dutch along with their local Javanese allies numbered around 700 men, assaulted and wrested Malacca from the Portuguese in January 1641. Assistance was also provided to the Dutch from the Johor Sultanate who provided around 500–600 additional men. The Dutch also received supplies and rations from nearby and their recently-captured base of Batavia. The campaign effectively destroyed the last bastion of Portuguese power, removing their influence in the Malay Archipelago. As per the agreement with Johor in 1606, the Dutch took control of Malacca and agreed not to seek territories or wage war with the Malay kingdoms.

=== Decline in trade ===
After the conquest of Malacca, the town yielded great profits in the 17th century, mostly due to the tin trade coming from Perak. But by 1700, the Dutch struggled to revive trade in Malacca. In that year, the town was rarely able to meet its tin quotas sent to Batavia. There were several attempts to revive trade by the governor, but VOC officials in Batavia was unwilling to improve tin trading prospects there and instead made policies to divert trade to Batavia. An Englishman described the town in 1711 "a healthful place, but of no great trade". The start of Bugis rule under the Johor Sultanate encouraged trade to Riau and served to reduce trade activity in Malacca.

Roger de Laver, the governor of Malacca in 1743, commented that despite his efforts to encourage the tin trade, it still did not see any improvement and attributed it from intense competition as Indian traders mainly traded in Aceh, Kedah and Perak.

=== Transfer of control to the British ===
In January 1795, Dutch stadtholder William V, Prince of Orange, seeking refuge in Great Britain, issued the Kew Letters, directing Dutch governors in the colonies to temporarily transfer authority to the United Kingdom and to cooperate with the British in the war against the French, so long as the "mother country" was under threat of invasion. Malacca was thus surrendered to British control, and would be under British occupation until the end of the Napoleonic Wars. Malacca remained under nominal Dutch sovereignty throughout the nearly two decades of British governance.

Under British administration, the Portuguese-era fortress of Malacca was demolished in stages beginning in 1807, as the British feared that the Dutch would use it against them in any future regional conflict. Only the Porta de Santiago (A Famosa) was spared destruction after the belated intervention of Sir Stamford Raffles.

The Anglo-Dutch Treaty of 1814 restored Malacca to Dutch rule; however, the Dutch did not regain full control until 1818. Sovereignty over Malacca was permanently ceded to the British under the Anglo-Dutch Treaty of 1824.

== Administration of Malacca ==
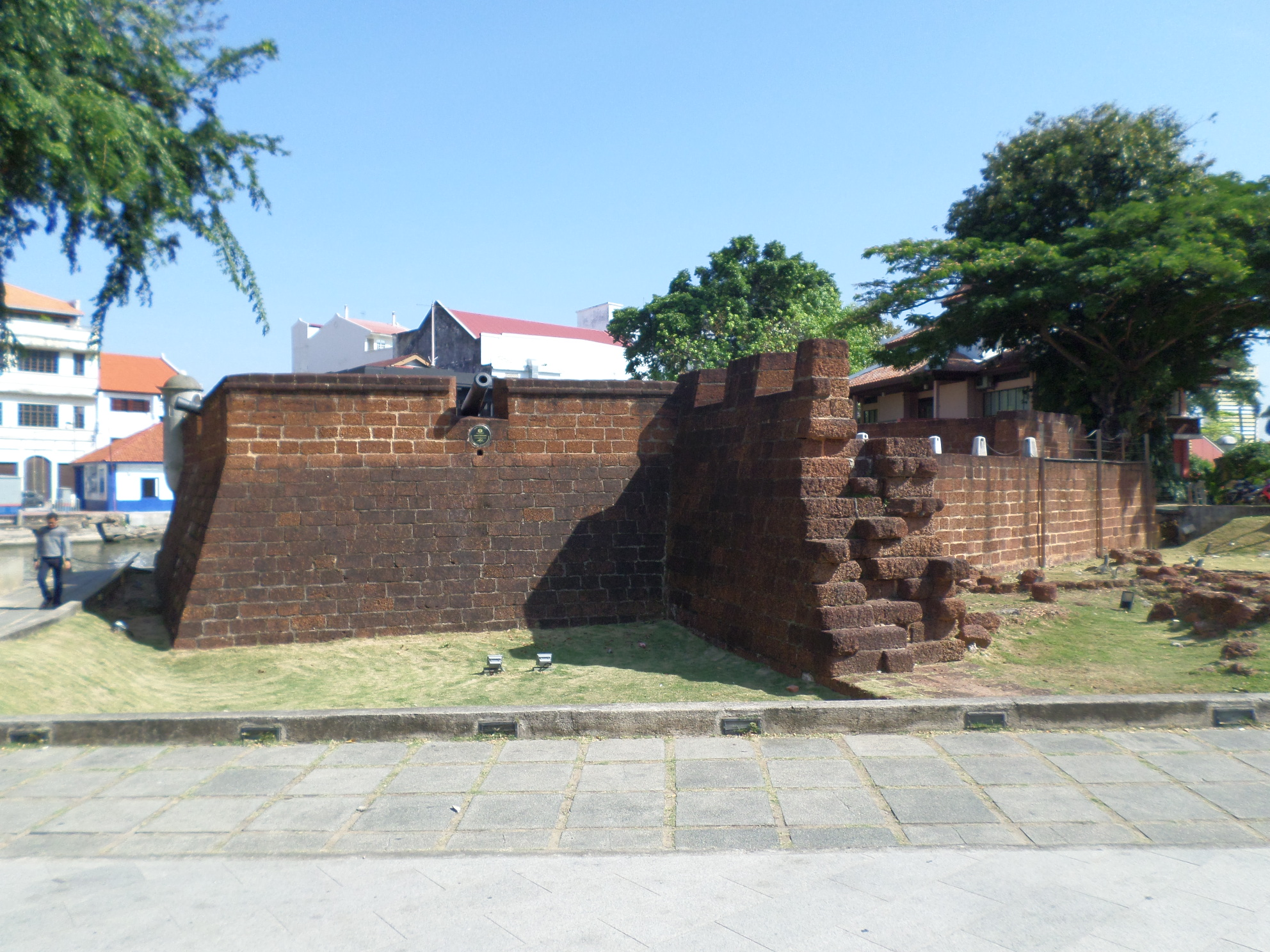
The construction of the Bastion Middelburg was carried out in 1660. It is strategically located at the mouth of Malacca River.

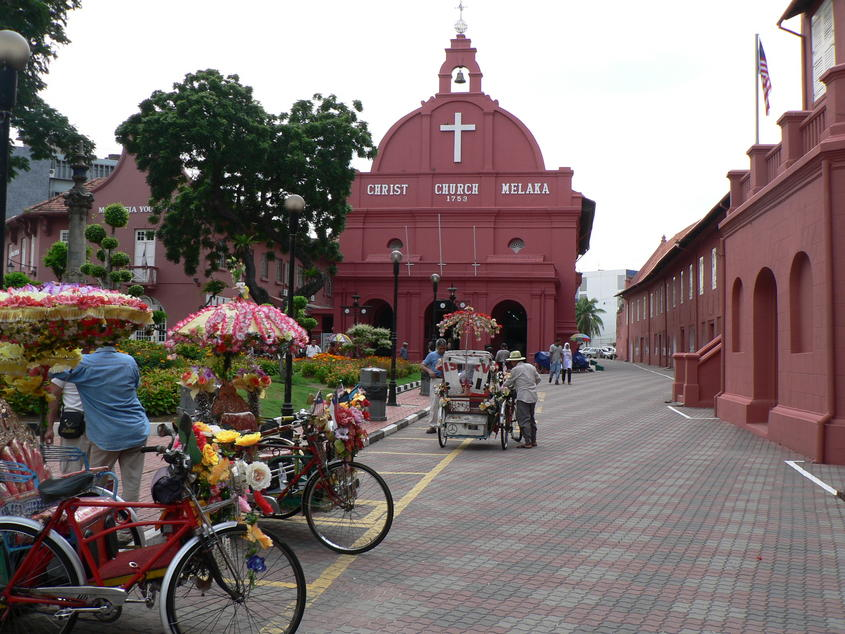
The Dutch Square, with Christ Church (left, built in 1753) and the Stadthuys (right)

Malacca was controlled as a colony of the VOC. All the chief administrators of Malacca were Dutch governors except for the brief period that the city was under British Residents during the Napoleonic Wars. However, focus on the administration of Malacca eventually waned by the Dutch as they preferred to focus on Batavia.

=== Governors of Malacca ===
Governors of Dutch Malacca (1641–1795)
Governors	From	Until
Johan van Twist	1641	1642
Jeremias van Vliet	1642	1645
Arnout de Vlamingh van Oudtshoorn	1645	1646
Jan Thyszoon Payart	1646	1662
Jan Anthonisz van Riebeeck	1662	1665
Balthasar Bort	1665	1679
Jacob Joriszoon Pits	1679	1680
Cornelis van Quaelberg	1680	1684
Nikolaas Schaghen	1684	1685
François Tack	1685	1686
Dirk Komans (1st time)	1686	1686
Thomas Slicher	1686	1691
Dirk Komans (2nd time)	1691	1692
Gelmer Vosberg	1692	1697
Goevert van Hoorn	1697	1700
Bernhard Phoonsen	1700	1704
Johan Grotenhuys (acting)	1704	1704
Karel Bolner	1704	1707
Pieter Rooselaar	1707	1709
Willem Six	1709	1711
Willem Moerman	1711	1717
Herman van Suchtelen	1717	1726
Johan Frederik Gobius	1726	1730
Pieter Rochus Pasques de Chavonnes	1730	1735
Roger de Laver	1735	1741
Willem Bernard Albinus	1741	1748
Pieter van Heemskerk	1748	1753
Willem Dekker	1753	1758
David Boelen	1758	1764
Thomas Schippers	1764	1771
Jan Crans	1771	1775
Pieter Gerardus de Bruijn	1775	1788
Abraham Couperus	1788	1795

British Residents of Malacca (1795–1818)
Residents	From	Until
Archibald Brown	1795	1795
Thomas Parr	1795	1796
Richard Tolson	1796	1797
David Campbell	1797	1798
Aldwell Taylor	1798	1803
Willem Jacob Cranssen (Dutch Governor)	1802	
William Farquhar	1803	1818

Governors of Dutch Malacca (1818–1825)
Governors	From	Until
Jan Samuel Timmermann Thijssen	1818	1822
Adriaan Koek (acting)	1822	1824
Hendrik Stephanus van Son	1824	1825

== The town and fortress of Malacca ==
The Dutch improved and expanded the Portuguese fortress as well as renovating the fortress' gate in 1670, they further built walls to protect the harbour and expanded city. During the mid-17th century the city hall or Stadthuys was constructed and served as the administrative center of the Dutch colony, which still stands today.

In 1757, the Dutch alongside the Bugis build Kota Supai in Kuala Linggi. It was abandoned several years later.

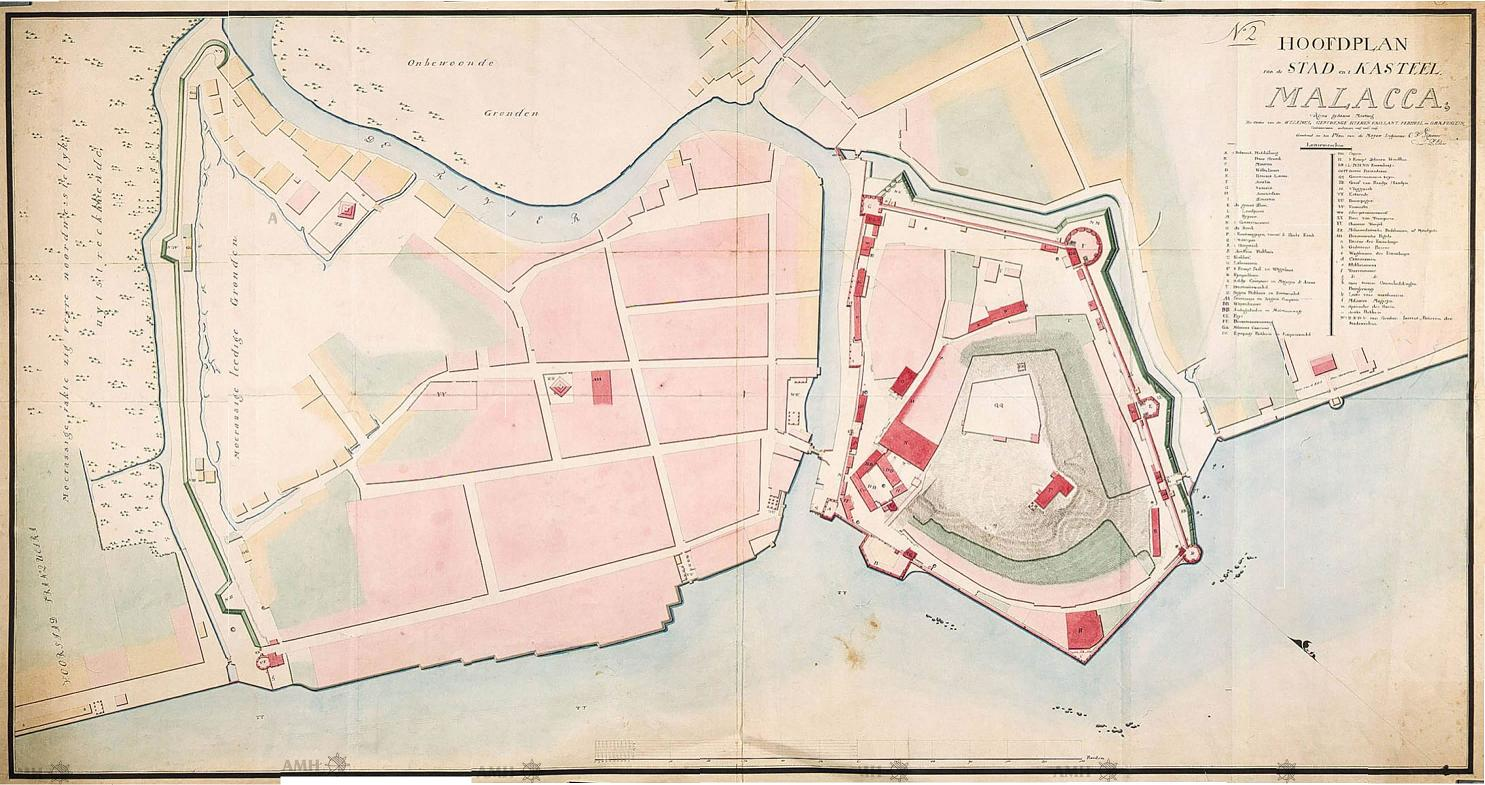
The town and fortress of Malacca in 1780

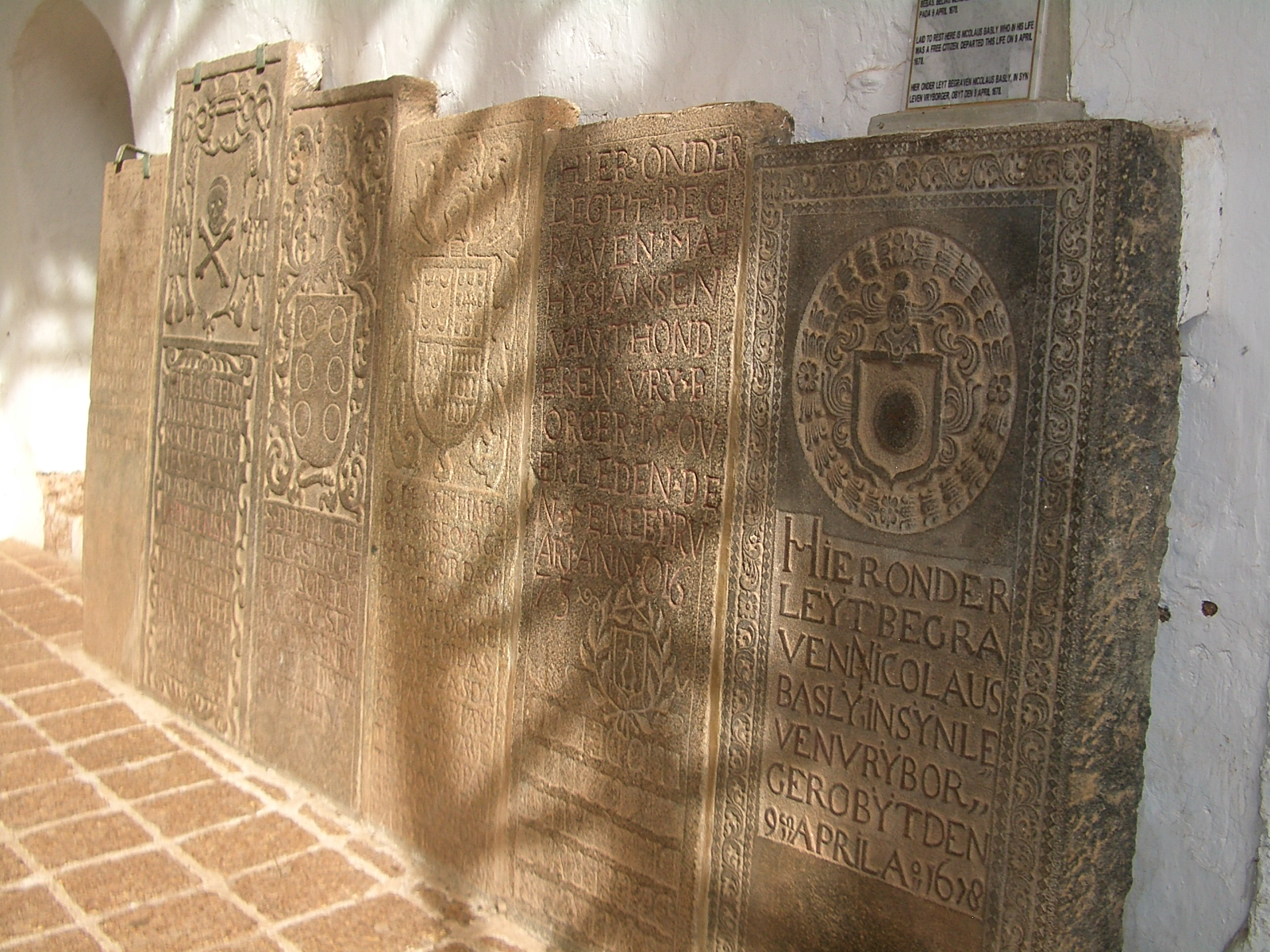
Dutch graves in the ruined St Paul's Church

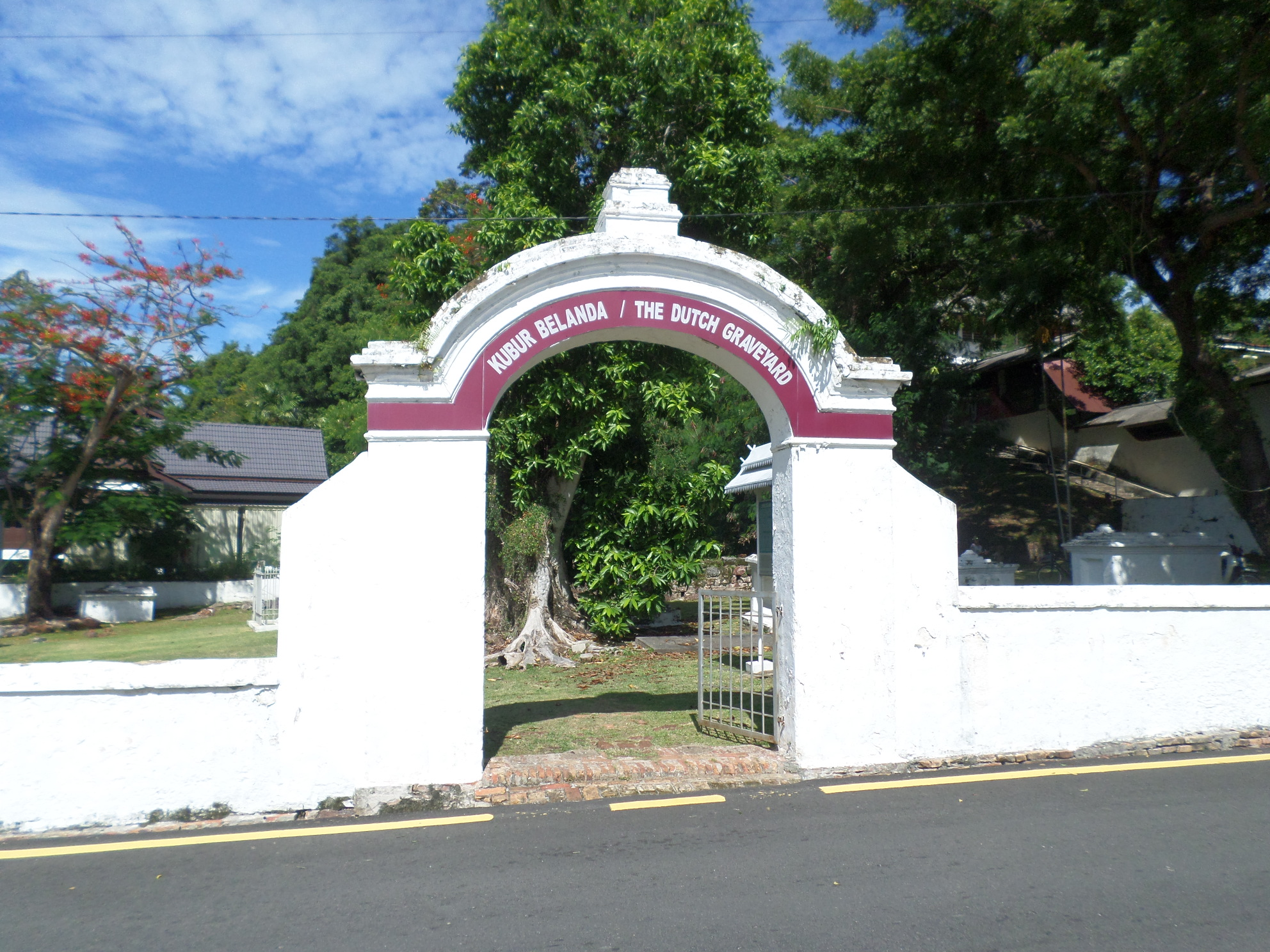
Dutch Graveyard

== See also ==
- Dutch Graveyard
