= 1819 in Singapore =

- Decades: 1820s
- See also: Other events of 1819; Timeline of Singaporean history

Events from the year 1819 in Singapore.

== Incumbents ==
- Resident: Maj-Gen. William Farquhar (6 February onward)

== Events ==
=== January ===
- 19 January – Stamford Raffles left Bencoolen on board the Indiana under the command of Captain James Pearl to establish a new settlement at the south of Malacca.
- 27 January – The Indiana, together with the Discover and the Investigator with William Farquhar surveying the possibility of the Karimun Islands as a new British site. After a discussion, they decided that it was not suitable.
- 28 January – The Indiana and Enterprise anchor at Saint John's Island and met with the locals in that evening.
- 29 January – Raffles and Farquhar landed by one of the rivers in Singapore and meet the Temenggong Abdul Rahman.
- 30 January – An informal agreement was written between the Temenggong and the British and the Union Jack is raised with a little ceremony.

=== February ===
- 1 February – Sultan Hussein (then known as Tungku Long) arrives from Riau.
- 6 February – The Singapore Treaty is signed by Raffles, Sultan Hussein and the Temenggong Abdul Rahman with commanders from the accompanying seven ships witnessing the event. Farquhar is appointed Resident and Commandant under the authority of Raffles as Lieutenant-Governor of Bencoolen. The Union Jack is raised on Bukit Larangan and marked the official founding of modern Singapore.
