= Hussein Shah of Johor =

Sultan of the Johor Sultanate (1776–1835)

Hussein Shah
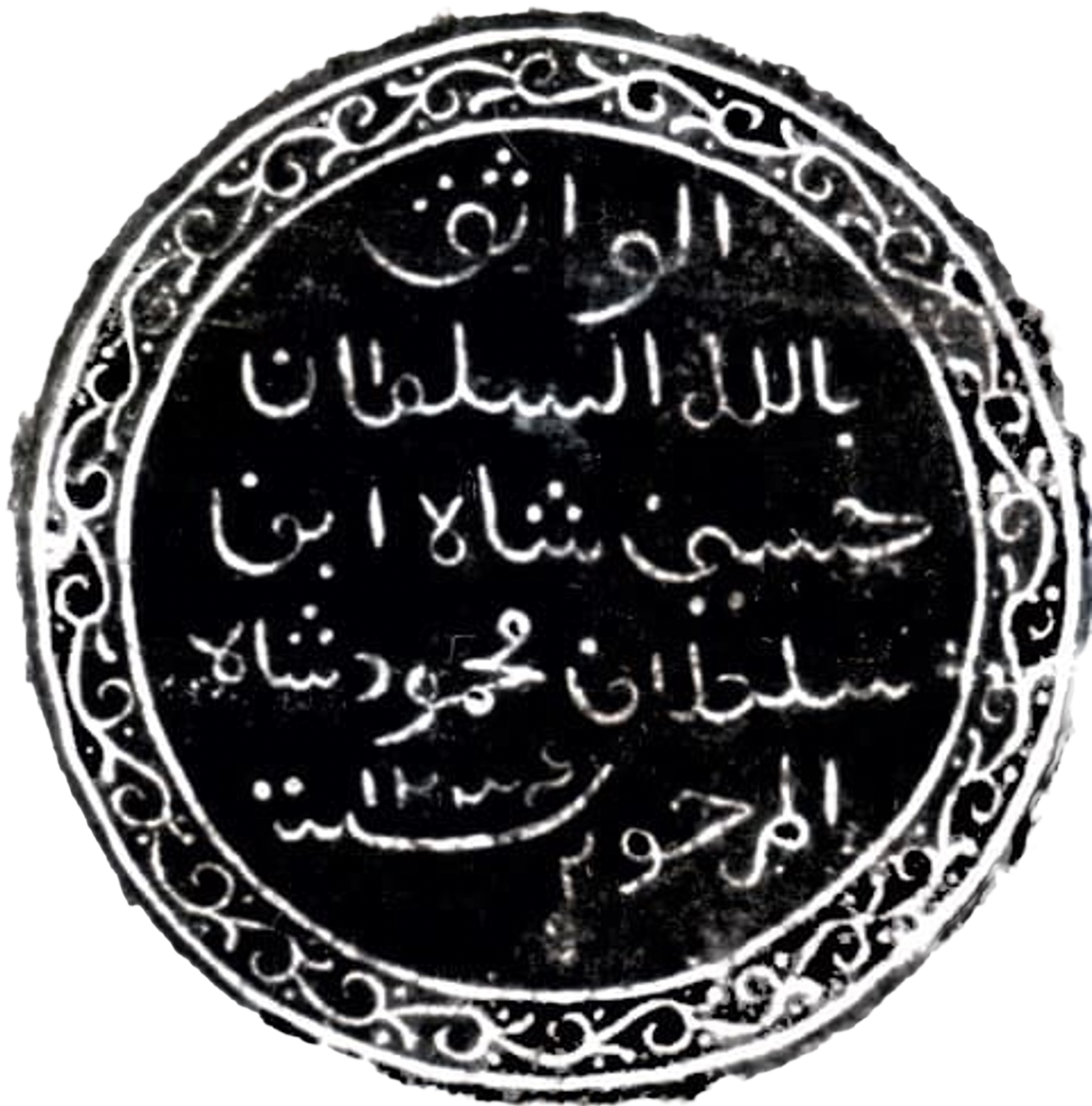
- The royal seal of the Sultan Hussein Shah of Johor and Singapore

Sultan of Johor
- Reign: 1819–1835
- Predecessor: Abdul Rahman Muazzam Shah
- Successor: Ali
- Born: 1776; Hulu Riau, Johor Sultanate
- Died: 5 September 1835 (aged 58–59); Malacca, British Malaya
- Burial: Makam Sultan Hussin, Tranquerah mosque, Malacca, British Malaya
- Spouse: 1. Tun Encik Puan Bulang; 2. Encik Wan Aishah; 3. Tengku Perbu
- Issue: Ali Iskandar; Tunku Jaafar; Tunku Maimunah; Tunku Safiyah
Names
- Hussein Mua'zzam Shah ibni Mahmud Shah Alam
Posthumous name
- Al-Marhum Sultan Husain Mu'azzam Shah ibni Al-Marhum Sultan Mahmud Shah Alam
- House: Bendahara dynasty
- Father: Mahmud Shah III
- Mother: Cik Makoh
- Religion: Sunni Islam

Sultan Hussein Mua'zzam Shah ibni Mahmud Shah Alam (Malay: Hussain Muazzam Shah ibni Mahmud Shah Alam or سلطان حسين معظم شاه ابن محمود شاه عالم, 1776 – 5 September 1835) was the 19th ruler of Johor-Riau. He signed two treaties with Britain which culminated in the founding of modern Singapore; during which he was nominally given recognition by the British as the Sultan of Johor and Singapore in 1819 and the Sultan of Johor in 1824.

However, Sultan Hussein was generally regarded by native nobles as a puppet ruler of the British, at least during the first few years of his reign. Towards the last years of his reign and during the first half of his son's reign as the Sultan of Johor, limited recognition was given by a few nobles. Known as having a personality that did not impress either the British or the local Malays, the contemporary writer Abdullah Abdul Kadir remarked that he was a "tiger without teeth".

== Succession dispute ==
Sultan Mahmud Shah III died in 1811 after reigning for more than forty years. He formally named no heir and left behind two sons by two different women, both of them of Bugis origin. The elder son, Hussein Shah stood the better chance of succeeding his father by primogeniture over his younger half-brother, Abdul Rahman. Hussein Shah, however, was away in Pahang for his marriage to Tun Encik Puan Bulang when his father died.

The Bugis faction, led by the underking Yamtuan Muda Raja Ja'afar, the sixth yang di-pertuan muda of Riau, supported Abdul Rahman as successor and hastily organised a coronation ceremony before Hussein Shah could return. Raja Ja'afar, in exchange for his support for Abdul Rahman (now sultan), was appointed as regent and wielded administrative authority. Hussein Shah was in Pahang, waiting for the monsoon winds to arrive, and was unaware of his brother's installation as sultan. Raja Ja'afar had written a letter to Hussein Shah, notifying him of Sultan Mahmud Shah III's death, but concealed his brother's ascension as sultan. Bendahara Tun Ali brought letters to Lingga, reporting Abdul Rahman's coronation during Hussein Shah's stay in Pahang. Hussein Shah sailed from Pahang to Lingga when the monsoon winds arrived, and was received by Sultan Abdul Rahman, who offered to abdicate in his favor. But he quickly backtracked after Raja Ja'afar made threats against Sultan Abdul Rahman. Hussein Shah remained in exile in Penyengat Island of the Riau Islands.

Questions pertaining to the legitimacy of Sultan Abdul Rahman's reign were raised; the royal regalia were still in the hands of Engku Putri Hamidah, the primary consort of Mahmud Shah III, who had stated her support for Hussein Shah as successor. In addition, Hussein Shah also had the support of the Temenggongs and Malay nobles, which made the prospect of putting a legitimate successor in place difficult.

Sultan Abdul Rahman devoted himself increasingly to religion; he had delegated all administrative duties to Raja Ja'afar by the time William Farquhar approached the Sultan to secure an alliance with the British in an attempt to reduce Dutch influence in the region.

== Founding of modern Singapore ==
=== 1819 treaty ===
In 1818, Sir Stamford Raffles persuaded the British East India Company (EIC) to establish a new base in the East Indies.

On 29 January 1819, Raffles landed at Singapura, and there he befriended Temenggong Abdul Rahman. Upon learning of the political tension in Johor, Raffles had the Temenggong smuggle Hussein Shah from Penyengat Island to Singapura. Raffles then made a deal with Hussein Shah. The British would recognize Hussein Shah as Sultan of Johor, and pay stipends to Hussein Shah and the Temenggong Abdul Rahman. In return, Hussein Shah would allow Raffles to establish a trading post in Singapore. This treaty was signed on 6 February 1819. The Dutch were extremely displeased with Raffles' action.

=== 1824 treaty ===
Tensions between the Dutch and British over Singapore persisted until 1824, when Sultan Hussein and Temenggong Abdul Rahman were called upon to sign the 1824 Treaty of Friendship and Alliance with the 2nd resident of Singapore Dr John Crawfurd at the Government Hill on 2 August 1824. Under the terms of that treaty, they agreed to maintain free trade in their possessions but were forbid to have any correspondence with foreigners without the EIC's permission. The Dutch would officially withdrew their opposition to the British presence in Singapore. The treaty has the effect of carving the Johor into two spheres of influence; modern Johor under the British and the new Sultanate of Riau under the Dutch. The treaty was concluded in London, between the British and the Dutch, effectively breaking Johor-Riau into two.

== Later years and death ==
The British successfully sidelined Dutch political influence by proclaiming Hussein Shah as the Sultan of Johor and Singapore. Hussein Shah's claim to be Sultan of Johor and Singapore was by all accounts not recognised by the Malay rulers and was only a nominal title. Temenggong Abdul Rahman's position, on the other hand, was strengthened as the signing of the treaties detached him the influence of Raja Ja'afar. The Dutch took the initiative of taking the royal regalia from Engku Putri Hamidah by force after hearing of rumors of Sultan Hussein requesting British aid to get hold of it. In November 1822, Sultan Abdul Rahman was installed as the Sultan of Riau-Lingga, complete with the royal regalia.

In the later part of his reign, growing British influence induced some Malay nobles, particularly Bendahara Ali, to recognize Sultan Hussein Shah. Sultan Abdul Rahman, who had devoted himself to religion, became content with his political sphere of influence in Lingga, where his family continued to maintain his household under the administrative direction of Raja Ja'afar, who ruled under the auspices of the Dutch. However, unresolved legal ambiguity in the legitimacy various local affairs, such as the status of Johor and Pahang. These were de jure possessions of Sultan Abdul Rahman and his successors, yet the 1824 treaty barred him as a Dutch vassal from exerting political authority over Johor and Pahang. In the light of these circumstances, the Temenggong and Bendahara increasingly exerted their independent authority. Also, largely as a result of the strong British influence in the Malay Peninsula, the continuously changing political dynamics gradually relegated these legitimacy disputes to irrelevance. (In 1857, the Sultan of Lingga, Sultan Mahmud Muzaffar Shah, who was also de jure head of the royal house of Johor, Pahang and Lingga, made a claim to be the rightful ruler of these states and sparked a brief civil war in Pahang.)

Sultan Hussein on his part, did not pursue any active claim to his sovereignty rights over Johor, even after Temenggong Abdul Rahman died in 1825, and his successor, Temenggong Daeng Ibrahim was still a youth at the time. Sultan Hussein spent much of his time at his Singapore residence in Istana Kampong Glam until 1834, when he moved to Malacca. Reports cited that he was a dispirited man, apparently with the lack of power and authority that he should be accorded as the sultan. Sultan Hussein died on 5 September 1835, and was buried near the Tranquerah Mosque in Malacca at the wishes of his Sultanah and Abdul Kadir, a Tamil-Muslim Imam.

Several of his descendants are buried in Jalan Kubor Cemetery in Singapore.

Preceded by Abdul Rahman Muazzam Shah	Sultan of Johor; 1819–1835	Succeeded by Ali
