= Abdul Rahman Muazzam Shah =

Sultan Abdul Rahman Muazzam Shah

Sultan of Johor
- Reign: 1811–1819
- Predecessor: Mahmud Shah III of Johor
- Successor: Hussein Shah of Johor

Sultan of Riau-Lingga
- Reign: 1818–1832
- Predecessor: position established
- Successor: Muhammad II Muazzam Shah of Lingga
- Born: Tengku Jumaat Abdul Rahman; 1780; Hulu Riau, Johor Sultanate
- Died: 9 August 1832 (aged 51–52); Daik, Riau-Lingga Sultanate
- Burial: Makam Bukit Cengkeh, Daik, Lingga, Riau Islands
Regnal name
- Paduka Sri Sultan Abdul Rahman I Muazzam Shah ibni al-Marhum Sultan Mahmud Shah Alam
- House: Bendahara dynasty
- Father: Mahmud Shah III of Johor
- Mother: Encik Mariam binti Dato' Hassan
- Religion: Sunni Islam

Paduka Sri Sultan Abdul Rahman I Muazzam Shah ibni al-Marhum Sultan Mahmud Syah Alam (Malay: ڤدوک سري سلطان عبدالرحمن اول معظم شاه ابن المرحوم سلطان محمود شاه عالم, born Tengku Jumaat Abdul Rahman (Malay: تڠکو جمعة عبدالرحمن) was the 18th Sultan and Yang di-Pertuan Besar of Johor and Pahang and their dependencies (r. 1811–1819) and the first Sultan of Riau-Lingga and their dependencies (r. 1818–1832).

== Biography ==
=== Early life ===
Born in Hulu Riau (present-day Tanjungpinang) in 1780, Abdul Rahman Muazzam Shah was the son of the 15th Sultan of Johor, Mahmud Shah III and his third wife, Encik Mariam binti Dato' Hassan (died in Lingga, 1831), the daughter of a Bugis nobleman of Sindereng, South Sulawesi.

=== Sultan of Johor ===
The seizure of power in the Sultanate of Johor-Riau-Lingga took place when Abdul Rahman Muazzam Shah was inaugurated as the Sultan of Johor preceding his older brother from another mother, Hussein Shah (the eldest son of Mahmud Shah III). The inauguration of Abdul Rahman Muazzam Shah was strongly supported by the Dutch.

=== Sultan of Lingga ===
In 1818, with strong support from Yang di-Pertuan Muda of Riau, Raja Ja'afar, Abdul Rahman Muazzam Shah was inaugurated as Sultan and Yang di-Pertuan Besar of Linga with the title of Sultan Abdul Rahman I Muazzam Shah ibni al-marhum Sultan Mahmud III Alam Shah. During his time in government, Riau-Lingga became the centre of development and the broadcasting of Islam. In 1823, Sultan Abdul Rahman established the Great Mosque in Penyengat Island in Riau Archipelago that is still there today.

Abdul Rahman Muazzam Shah Bendahara dynasty Born: 1780 Died: 1832
Regnal titles
Preceded by Mahmud Shah III	Sultan of Johor; 1811–1819	Succeeded by Hussein Shah
Preceded by Position established	Sultan of Riau-Lingga; 1818–1832	Succeeded by Muhammad II Muazzam Shah
