= Daik =

- Village

Other transcription(s)
  - Jawi: دائق
  - Chinese: 大一
  - Pinyin: Dà yī
- Location in the Riau Islands Location in Sumatra Location in Indonesia
- Coordinates: 0°12′0″N 104°37′0″E
- Country: Indonesia
- Province: Riau Islands
- Regency: Lingga Regency
- Time zone: UTC+7 (Indonesia Western Time)
- Area code: (+62) 776

Daik (Jawi: دائق; Chinese: 大一; pinyin: Dàyī) is the main village (kelurahan) on the island of Lingga of Lingga Regency, in the Riau Islands in Indonesia. It is located at 0°12′0″N 104°37′0″E.

== History ==
Daik was the capital of the Lingga Sultanate for almost 100 years, from 1819 to 1911.

== Climate ==
Daik has a tropical rainforest climate (Af) with heavy rainfall year-round.

Climate data for Daik
Month	Jan	Feb	Mar	Apr	May	Jun	Jul	Aug	Sep	Oct	Nov	Dec	Year
Mean daily maximum °C (°F)	30.0 (86.0)	30.6 (87.1)	31.0 (87.8)	31.1 (88.0)	31.4 (88.5)	31.3 (88.3)	31.0 (87.8)	31.4 (88.5)	30.9 (87.6)	30.8 (87.4)	30.4 (86.7)	30.1 (86.2)	30.8 (87.5)
Daily mean °C (°F)	26.1 (79.0)	26.5 (79.7)	26.7 (80.1)	26.8 (80.2)	27.2 (81.0)	27.2 (81.0)	26.8 (80.2)	27.1 (80.8)	26.7 (80.1)	26.6 (79.9)	26.3 (79.3)	26.3 (79.3)	26.7 (80.1)
Mean daily minimum °C (°F)	22.3 (72.1)	22.5 (72.5)	22.5 (72.5)	22.6 (72.7)	23.1 (73.6)	23.1 (73.6)	22.7 (72.9)	22.9 (73.2)	22.5 (72.5)	22.4 (72.3)	22.2 (72.0)	22.6 (72.7)	22.6 (72.7)
Average rainfall mm (inches)	221 (8.7)	145 (5.7)	166 (6.5)	220 (8.7)	256 (10.1)	221 (8.7)	219 (8.6)	191 (7.5)	219 (8.6)	246 (9.7)	257 (10.1)	298 (11.7)	2,659 (104.6)
Source: Climate-Data.org
