= Tranquerah Mosque =

Mosque in Malacca City, Malaysia

- Masjid Tengkera مسجد تڠكيرا
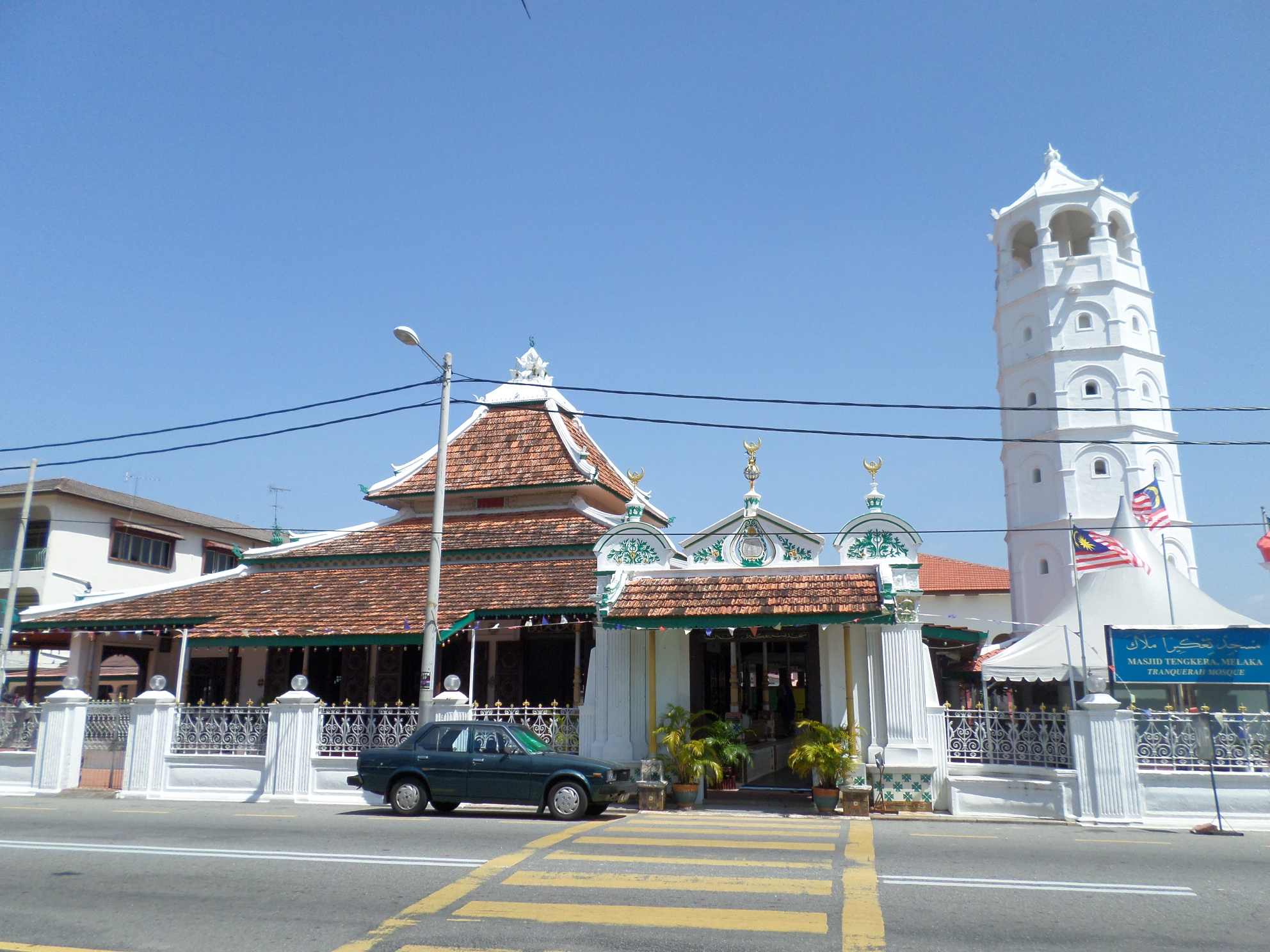

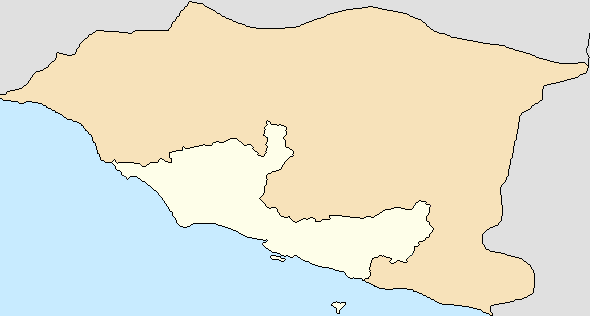
- Location within Malacca City

Religion
- Affiliation: Islam
- Branch/tradition: Sunni

Location
- Location: Malacca City, Malacca, Malaysia
- Interactive map of Tranquerah Mosque
- Coordinates: 2°12′14.7″N 102°13′55.1″E

Architecture
- Type: mosque
- Style: Javanese
- Completed: 1728
- Minaret: 1

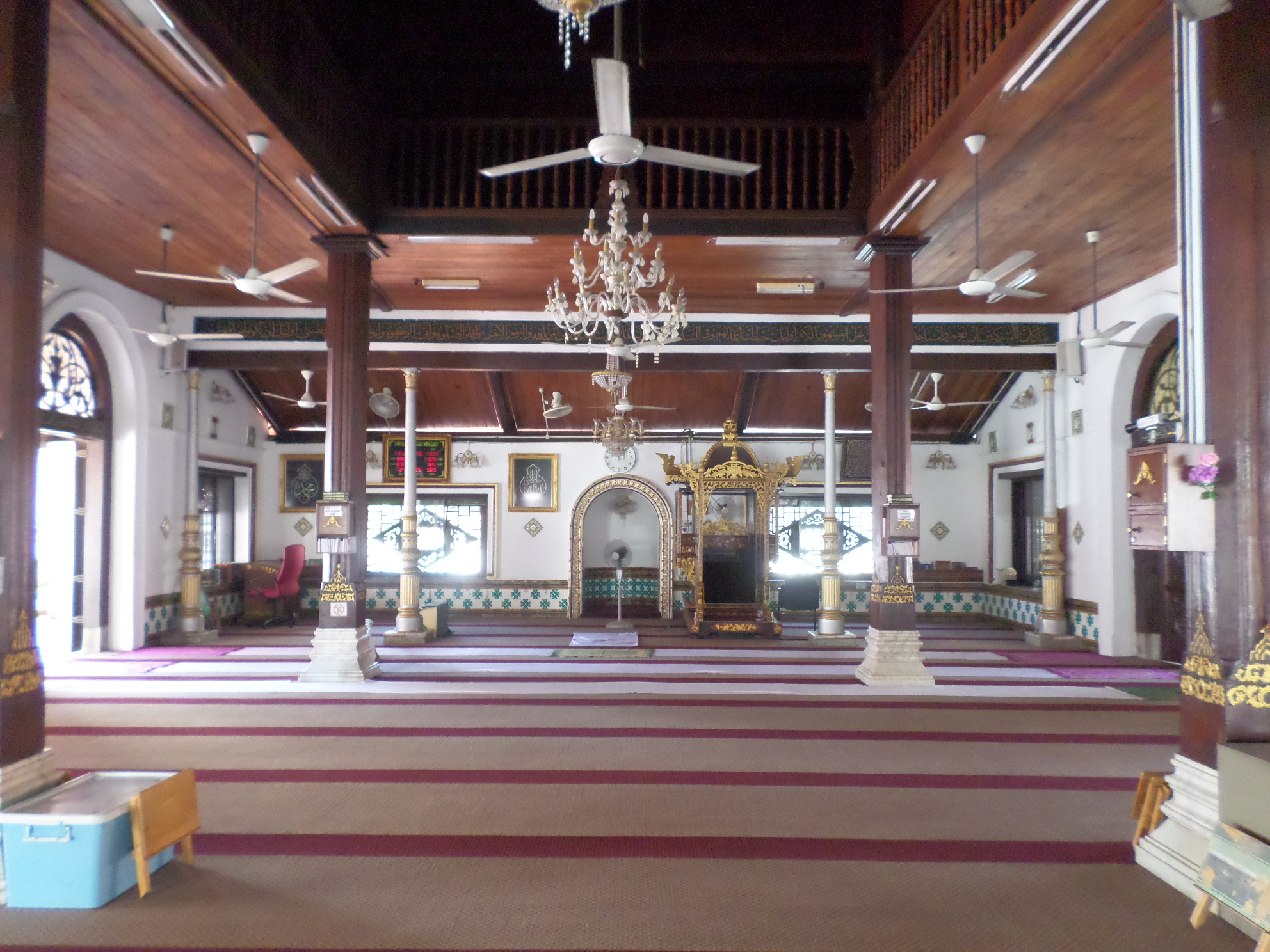
Tranquerah Mosque prayer hall

Tranquerah Mosque (Malay: Masjid Tengkera) is a mosque in Malacca City, Malacca, Malaysia. It was built in 1728 and located next to tomb of Sultan Hussein Shah of Johor and used to be the state mosque of Malacca before the establishment of Al Azim Mosque in 1990.

The original mosque structure was made entirely of timber bought from Kalimantan, Dutch East India Company. It had since undergone several renovations and restorations. The mosque consists of Javanese culture components. It features triple-tiered pyramidal roof and a square base. It is one of the few mosque in Malaysia which has a pagoda in place of a minaret. The interior is a mixture of Malay, Chinese and Indonesian elements.

== See also ==
- Islam in Malaysia
