= Sultan of Riau-Lingga =

- Duli Yang Maha Mulia Paduka Seri Sultan dan Yang Dipertuan Besar Kerajaan Riau-Lingga dengan segala daerah takluknya
- State

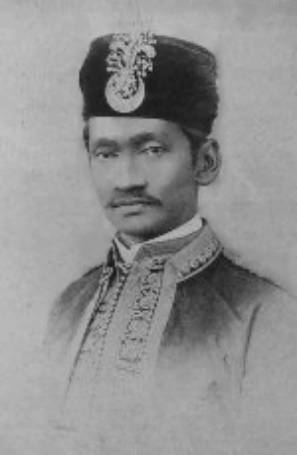
- Abdul Rahman II Muazzam Shah, the last Sultan of Riau-Lingga (1890-1911)

Details
- Style: His Majesty
- First monarch: Abdul Rahman Muazzam Shah
- Last monarch: Abdul Rahman II Muazzam Shah
- Formed: 29 October 1830; 196 years ago
- Abolished: 10 February 1911; 115 years ago

The Sultan of Riau-Lingga was the hereditary position and ruler of the Riau-Lingga Sultanate.

== History ==
The official title was His Majesty the Sultan and Yang di-Pertuan Besar of the Kingdom of Riau-Lingga with all its territories (Duli Yang Maha Mulia Paduka Seri Sultan dan Yang Dipertuan Besar Kerajaan Riau-Lingga dengan segala daerah takluknya).

This position was established when the Riau-Lingga Sultanate came into existence after the Anglo-Dutch Treaty of 1824 was enforced in the Malay World through the Treaty of 29 October 1830 where the Riau and Lingga and the surrounding islands remained under the rule of the 16th Sultan of Johor, Sultan Abdul Rahman Muazzam Shah while the states of Johor and Pahang were no longer under his rule and became independent states.

The position was abolished when the Riau-Lingga Sultanate was dissolved by the Dutch on 10 February 1911 because the last Sultan of Riau-Lingga, Sultan Abdul Rahman II Muazzam Shah, did not want to comply with the demand of the Dutch which asked him to sign an agreement that would totally limit his powers and expand Dutch control on the Riau-Lingga Sultanate.

== Sultans of Riau-Lingga ==
No.	Sultans of Riau-Lingga	Reign	Central Government	Notes
House of Bendahara
1	Abdul Rahman Muazzam Shah	29 October 1830 – 9 August 1832	Lingga	
2	Muhammad II Muazzam Shah	9 August 1832 – 1835	Lingga	
3	Mahmud IV Muzaffar Shah	1835 – 7 October 1857	Lingga	
4	Sulaiman Badrul Alam Shah II	7 October 1857 – 17 September 1883	Lingga	
House of Yang di-Pertuan Muda
5	Abdul Rahman II Muazzam Shah	13 October 1883 – 10 February 1911	Lingga (1883–1900); Riau (1900–1911)	
