= Lingga Regency =

Regency in Riau Islands, Indonesia

Lingga Regency Kabupaten Lingga
- Regency
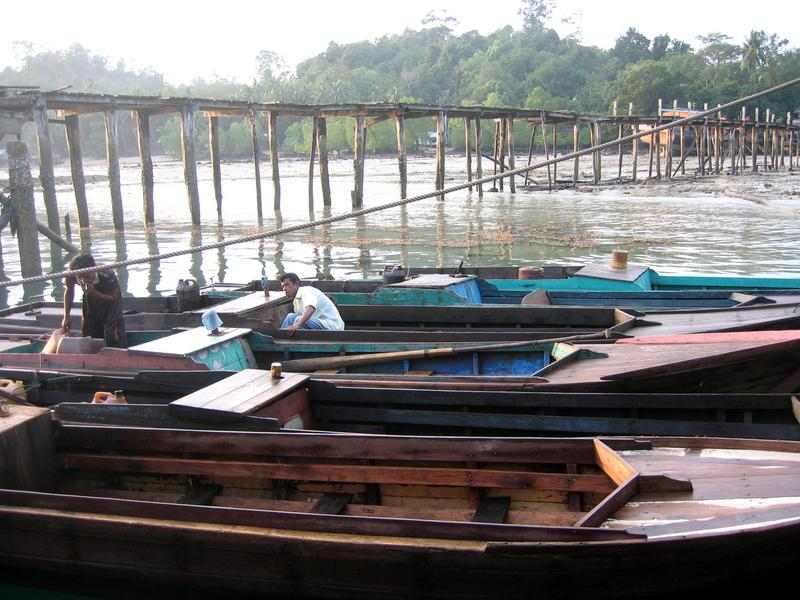
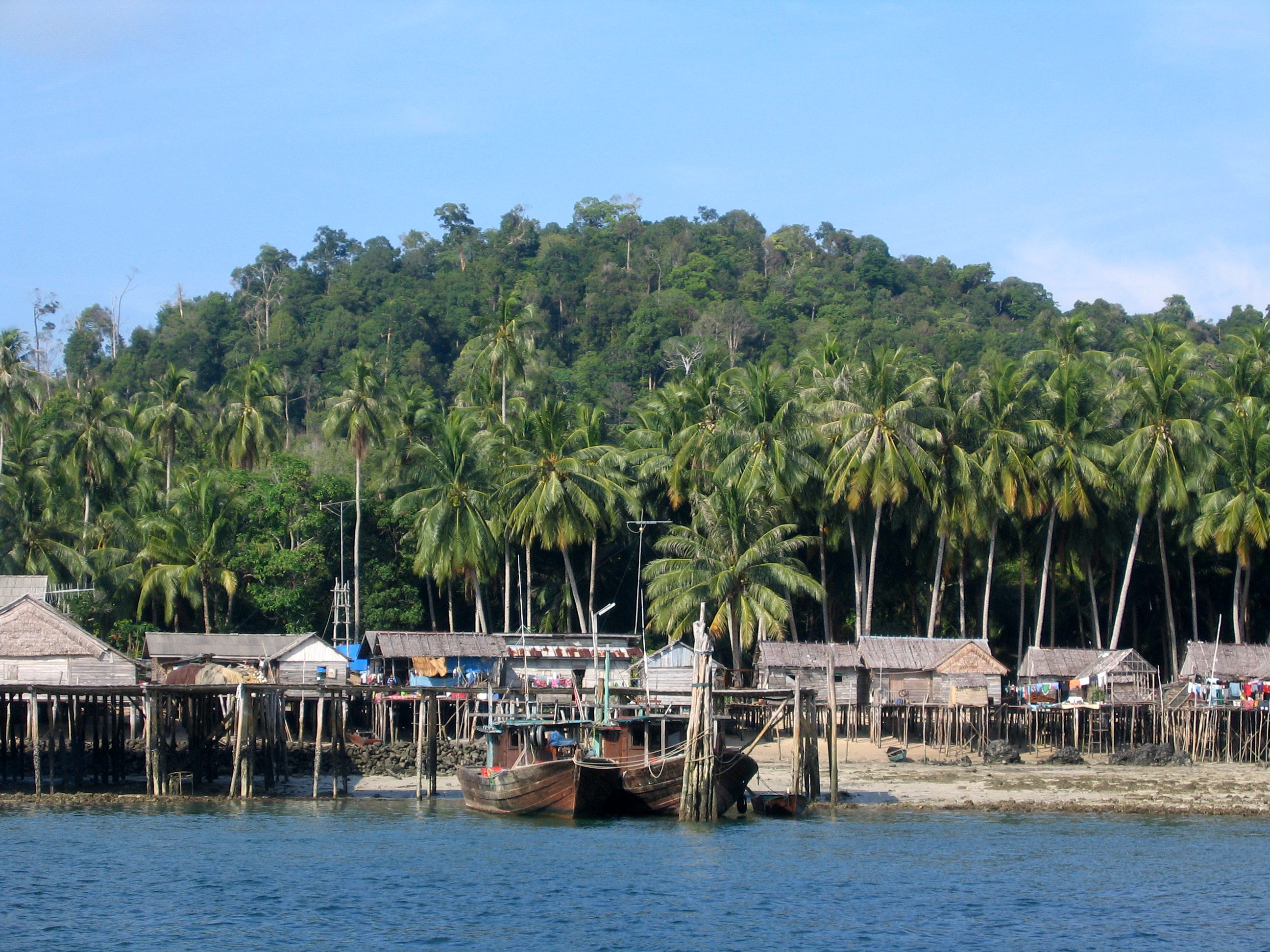
- From top to bottom: Port of Jago on the northern coast of Singkep, close to the island of Lingga and Stilt houses in Cempa.

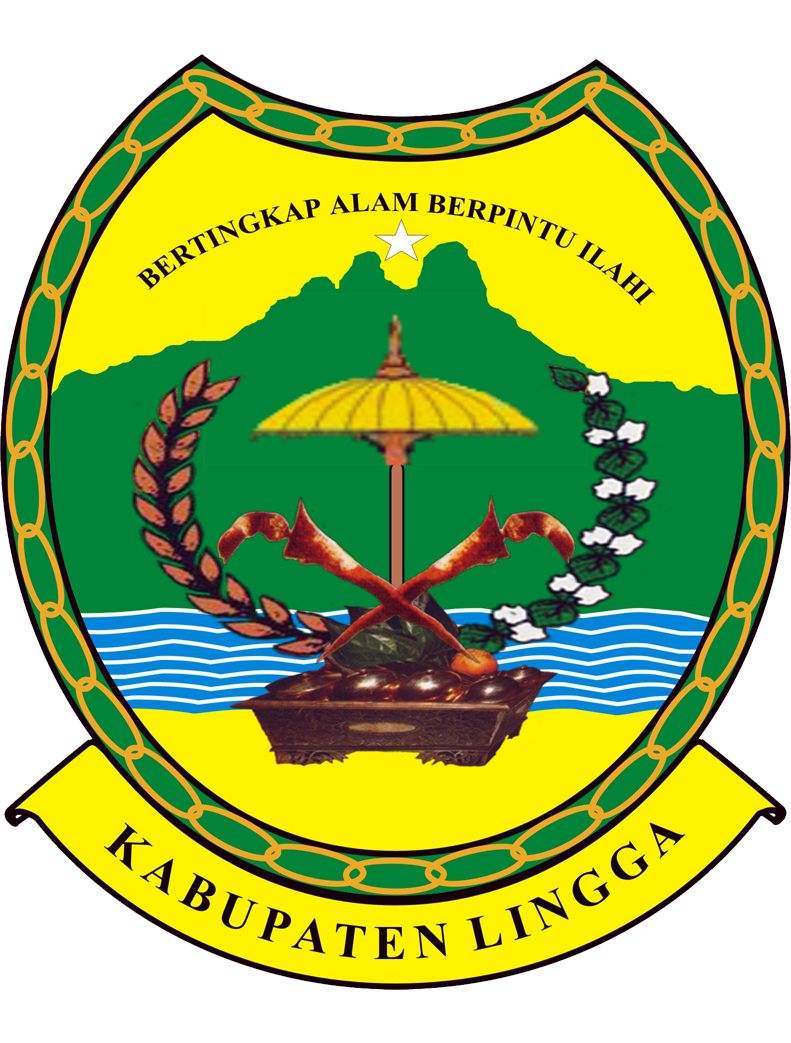
- Coat of arms
- Motto(s): Bertingkap Alam Berpintu Ilahi (Opening to the Divine Gate of Nature)
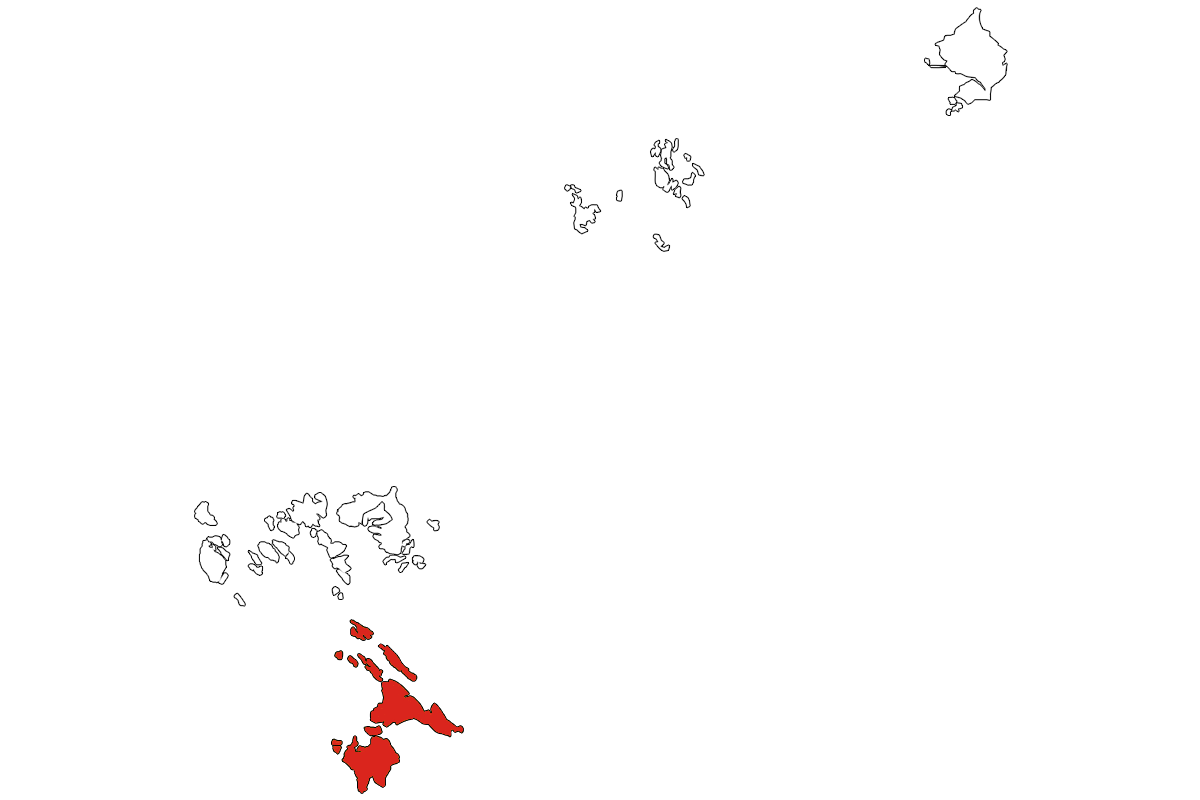
- Location within Riau Islands

- Location in Sumatra and Indonesia Lingga Regency (Indonesia)
- Coordinates: 0°16′S 104°29′E
- Country: Indonesia
- Province: Riau Islands
- Regency seat: Daik

Government
  - Regent: Muhammad Nizar
  - Vice Regent: Novrizal

Area
  - Total: 2,193.93 km^{2} (847.08 sq mi)

Population (2025 estimate)
  - Total: 101,472
  - Density: 46.2512/km^{2} (119.790/sq mi)
- Time zone: UTC+7 (Indonesia Western Time)
- Area code: (+62) 776
- Website: linggakab.go.id

The Lingga Regency (Indonesian: Kabupaten Lingga) is a group of 600 islands in Indonesia, located south of Singapore and along both sides of the equator, off the eastern coast of Riau Province on Sumatra island. They are due south of the populated Riau Archipelago, known for the industrial island of Batam and the tourist-frequented island of Bintan, although the Lingga Islands themselves are rarely visited due to the infrequent local transportation. The equator goes through the northern tip of Lingga Island, the main island in the archipelago.

Administratively they form a Regency of the Riau Islands Province with a land area of 2,193.93 km^{2} and a population of 86,244 people at the 2010 census and 98,633 at the 2020 census; the official estimate as at mid 2025 was 101,472 (comprising 51.8% males and 48.2% females). The regency seat lies at Daik on Lingga Island.

The population are mainly Malay, Bugis and Chinese (predominantly Hakka, Teochew and Hokkien).

== Name ==
Lingga derives its name from the profile of Mount Daik which is shaped like the Hindu lingam, often interpreted as a phallic symbol. This mountain has three sharp teeth at its peak; one of them seems to have broken off at its base, and it was immortalised by Malay poets as the symbol of durability. The poem is

Pulau Pandan jauh ke tengah,
Gunung Daik bercabang tiga,
Hancur badan dikandung tanah,
Budi yang baik dikenang juga. By nuar

Nearby are the remains of the fort of Benteng Bukit Cening, overlooking the sea. The cannons are still lined up, as if they were awaiting another enemy attack.

== Islands ==
By size and population the most important islands in the archipelago are Lingga and Singkep, then Sebangka and Bakung.

- Lingga with smaller Pulau Alut.
- Pulau Selayar of Riau Islands between Lingga and Singkep.
- Singkep with Pulau Posek to the west, Pulau Serak to the southwest, and Pulau Lalang to the south.
- Sebangka and Bakung to the northwest of Lingga, with town of Limas, and the islets Senayang, Kapas, Kentar and Mowang.
- Pulau Lobam and Cempah to the west of Sebangka.
- Temiang and Mesawak in the north.

== Administrative districts ==
At the time of the 2010 census, the regency was divided into five districts (kecamatan) - Singkep, Lingga, Senayang, Singkep Barat and Lingga Utara - but four additional districts were created in 2012 (Singkep Selatan and Singkep Pesisir from parts of Singkep District, and Selayar and Lingga Timur from parts of Lingga District), another in 2018 (Kepulauan Posek - from part of Singkep Selatan District) and three more in 2019 (Bakung Serumpun, Temiang Pesisir and Katang Bidare - all out of Senayang District).

The thirteen districts are tabulated below with their areas and their populations at the 2010 census and the 2020 census, together with the official estimates as at mid 2025. The table also includes the location of the district administrative centres, the number of villages in each district (totaling 75 rural desa and 9 urban kelurahan), and their post codes. Altogether the archipelago contains some 600 islands.

Kode Wilayah	Name of District (kecamatan)	Area in km^{2}	Pop'n census 2010	Pop'n census 2020	Pop'n estimate mid 2025	Admin centre	No. of villages	Post code
24.04.04	Singkep Barat ^{(a)} (West Singkep)	406.25	14,552	13,802	13,939	Raya	12 ^{(b)}	29875
24.04.10	Kepulauan Posek (Posek Islands)	43.13	^{(c)}	3,046	3,228	Posek	3	29876
24.04.01	Singkep ^{(d)}	124.20	26,647	23,201	23,181	Dabo	6 ^{(e)}	29871
24.04.09	Singkep Selatan (South Singkep)	158.61	^{(f)}	2,447	2,808	Resang	4 ^{(g)}	29878
24.04.06	Singkep Pesisir (Coastal Singkep)	95.10	^{(f)}	4,785	4,874	Lanjut	6	29870
24.04.02	Lingga ^{(h)}	369.78	16,651	12,171	12,730	Daik	11 ^{(i)}	29872
24.04.08	Selayar (island)	41.85	^{(j)}	3,422	3,474	Penuba	4	29877
24.04.07	Lingga Timur (East Lingga)	128.83	^{(j)}	3,819	5,258	Sungai Pinang	6	29872
24.04.05	Lingga Utara ^{(k)} (North Lingga)	361.32	9,701	10,843	10,295	Pancur	12 ^{(b)}	29874
24.04.03	Senayang ^{(l)}	179.86	18,693	6,034	6,246	Senayang	5 ^{(b)}	29873
24.04.13	Bakung Serumpun	140.91	^{(m)}	7,466	7,753	Rejai	6	29873
24.04.12	Temiang Pesisir (Temiang Coastal)	104.51	^{(m)}	3,594	3,610	Tajur Biru	3	29873
24.04.11	Katang Bidare	39.58	^{(m)}	4,003	4,076	Benan	5	29873
24.04	Totals	2,193.93	86,244	98,633	101,472	Lingga	84	

Notes: (a) Singkep Barat District comprises 47 islands. (b) including one kelurahan (the district centre).
(c) The 2010 population of the new Kepulauan Posek District is included with the figure for Singkep Barat District, from which it was cut out in 2018.
(d) Singkep District comprises 32 islands. (e) comprising 3 kelurahan (Dabo, Dabo Lama and Sungailumpur) and 3 desa.
(f) The 2010 populations of the new Singkep Selatan District and Singkep Pesisir District are included with the figure for Singkep District, from which they were cut out in 2012.
(g) including one kelurahan (Berlian). (h) Lingga District comprises 71 islands. (i) including 2 kelurahan - Daik and Daik Sepincan.
(j) The 2010 populations of the new Selayar District and Lingga Timur District are included with the figure for Lingga District, from which they were cut out in 2012.
(k) Lingga Utara District comprises 12 islands. (l) Senayang District (including the three new districts cut from it in 2019) comprises 324 islands.
(m) The 2010 populations of the new Bakung Serumpun District, Tamiang Pesisir District and Katang Bidare District are included with the figure for Senayang District, from which they were cut out in 2019.

== Demographics ==
=== Religion ===
Religion in Lingga Islands Regency (2023)
religion	percent
Islam	92.03%
Buddhism	4.98%
Protestantism	1.84%
Roman Catholicism	1.12%
Confucianism	0.02%
Hinduism and Others	0.01%

Islam is the dominant religion in the Lingga Islands regency, with 91.40% of the total population identifying themselves as Muslim. Other religions are Buddhism, which forms 5.89% of the total population, Christianity, which forms 2.63% of the total population, Hinduism, which forms 0.02% of the total population and Confucianism, which forms 0.03% of the total population.

== Transport ==
Ferry services to the islands from outside the archipelago come from the provincial capital to the north, Tanjung Pinang on Bintan, including from Singapore. These days the main industry is fishing. There are a number of fine beaches with some coral around the Archipelago but there is very little tourism on account of the poor transport links with the outside world.

- Singkep has two ports, Dabo near Dabosingkep and Jago near Sungaibuluh. Service to the port of Muntok on Bangka Island of Sumatera Selatan ceased operating regularly with the demise of the tin mining industry. However, a high-speed ferry continues to connect Tanjung Pinang to Singkep, from where local boats may be chartered to Lingga.
- For Lingga, Daik is the major town and port. It can be reached in a day from Singapore transferring at Tanjung Pinang.

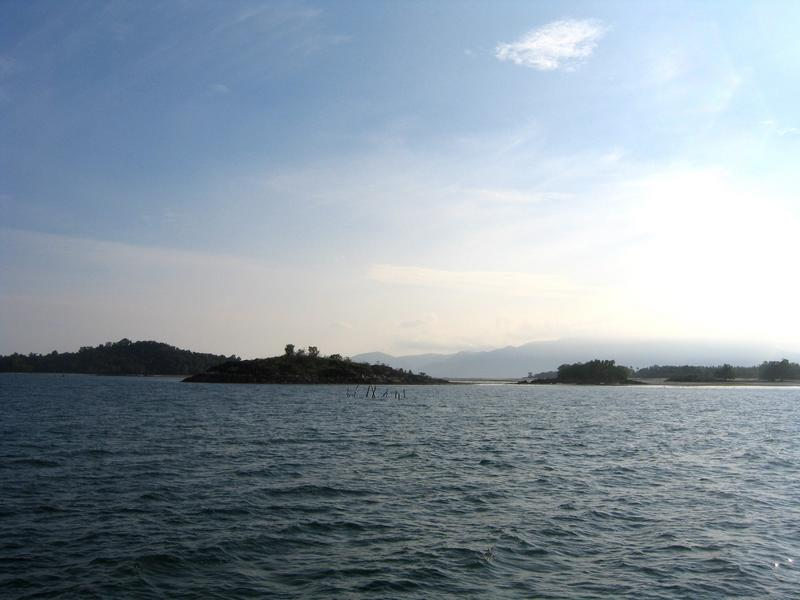
Many islands that are part of the Lingga archipelago, including the island of Lingga itself towards the right, with its 1163-metre fog-obscured peak.

== Lingga Roads ==
Lingga Roads is an anchorage in the Lingga Islands, south of Lingga Island and northeast of Singkep. During World War II, Lingga Roads was used as a fleet anchorage by major units of the Imperial Japanese Navy, in order that these ships be near a source of fuel. It was from Lingga Roads that the main Japanese southern striking force deployed for the Battle of Leyte Gulf.
