= Lingga Island =

Island in Indonesia

Coordinates: 0°10′S 104°39′E

Location of Lingga Island in Riau Islands Province

Lingga Island is the largest and most populated of the Lingga Islands, Indonesia. It has an area of 889 square kilometres (343 sq mi). It is located south of the Riau Islands off the east coast of Sumatra. The other major island of the archipelago is Singkep.

Lingga is known for its three-pronged pinnacle of Mount Daik which has cultural significance to the Malays including the island's local population, it has become a popular hiking destination among neighbouring Malaysian and Singaporean Malays.
