= Sang Nila Utama =

- Sri Tri Buana, "Lord of Three Worlds"
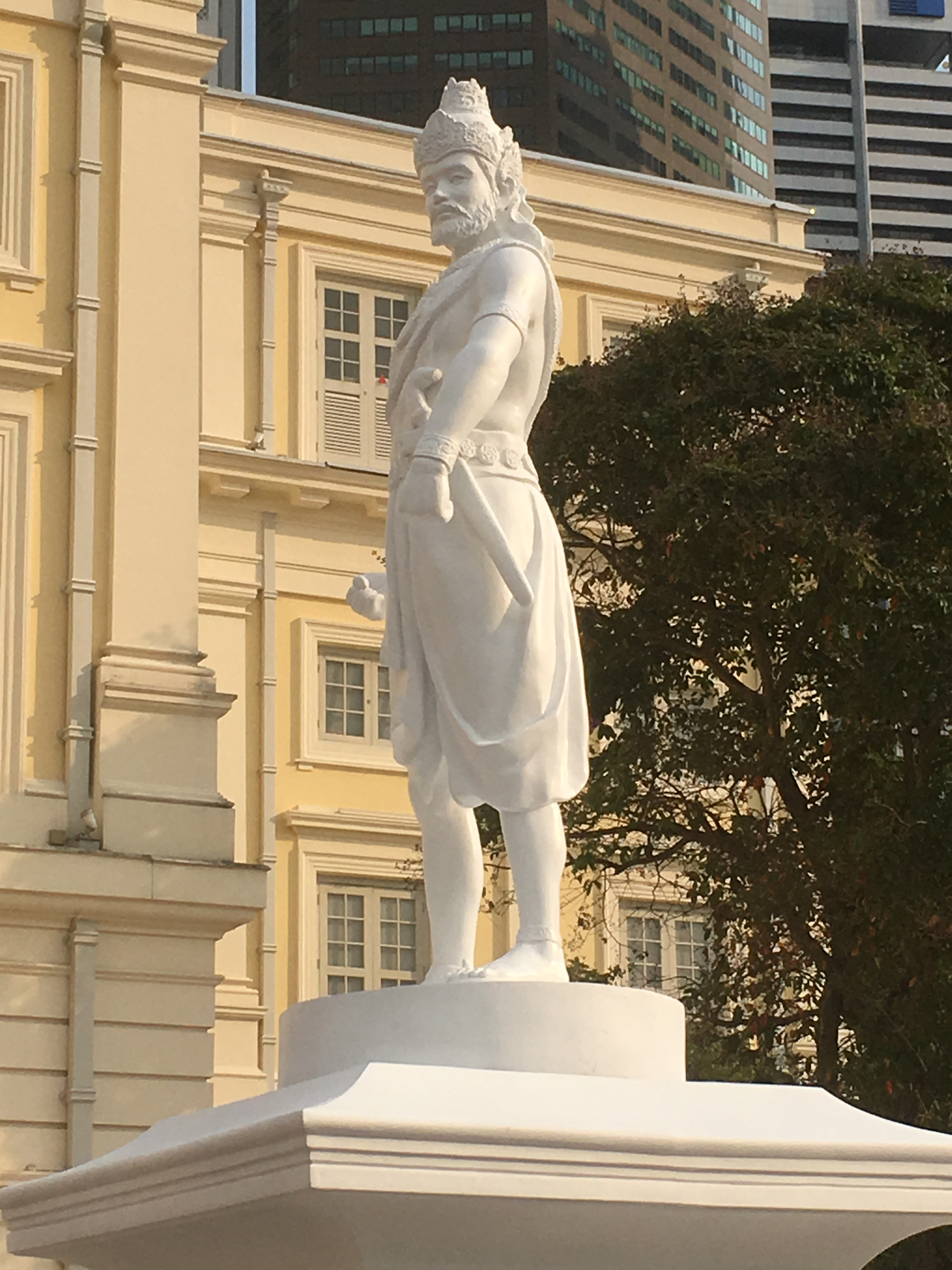
- Statue of Sang Nila Utama at the Raffles' Landing Site as part of events commemorating the bicentennial of the founding of modern Singapore, along with other pioneers of the modern period of Singapore.

1st Raja of Singapura
- Reign: 1299–1347
- Predecessor: Kingdom established
- Successor: Sri Wikrama Wira
- Born: 1278; Palembang
- Died: 1347 (aged 68–69); Kingdom of Singapura
- Burial: Keramat Iskandar Shah, Fort Canning Hill (disputed)
- Spouse: Wan Sri Bini
- Issue: Sri Wikrama Wira
- Father: Sang Sapurba
- Religion: Hinduism

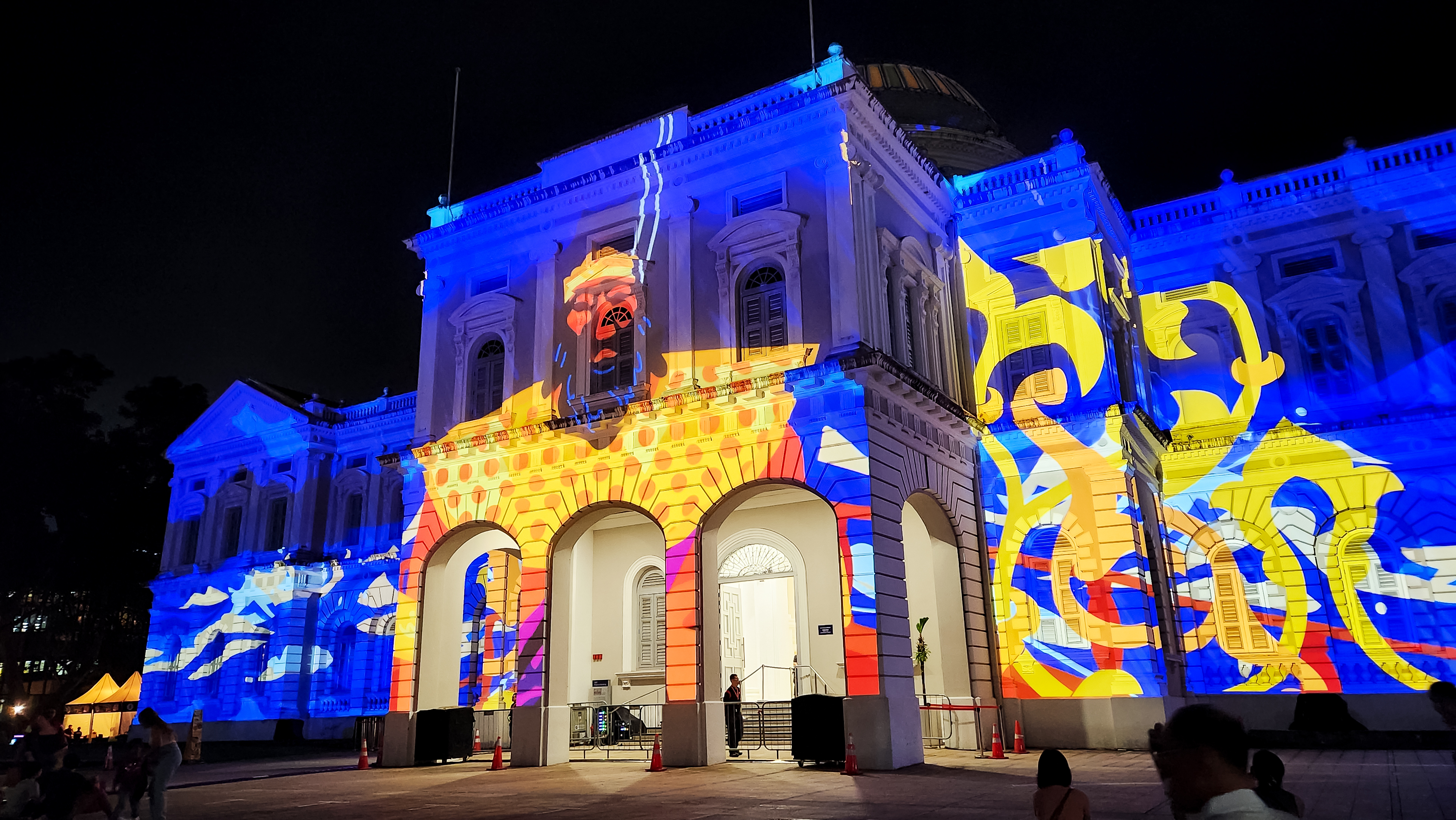
Light mapping projection show during the Singapore Night Festival 2023 retelling the legend of Sang Nila Utama.

Sang Nila Utama was a prince from Palembang and is the founder of the Kingdom of Singapura in 1299. His official title adopted upon his coronation was Sri Tri Buana (Sanskrit: श्री त्रि भुवन, romanized: śrī tri bhuvana), which can be translated as "Lord of Three Worlds"; the "Three Worlds" may refer to the three realms of the universe—the heaven of the gods, the world of humans, and the underworld of demons or his lordship over Java, Sumatra and Temasek/Singapura. This title is attested to elsewhere in Southeast Asia.

Sang Nila Utama died in 1347 and his son, Sri Wikrama Wira succeeded him. Malay Annals stated that the name of the founder of Singapore was Sri Tri Buana, who was later associated with the Maharaja of Bhumi Malayu, Srimat Tribhuwanaraja Mauli Warmadewa. The account of his life and those of his successors is given in the Malay Annals; the historicity of the events as recorded there is debated by scholars, and some contend that Sang Nila Utama may be a mythical figure, even if the historicity of Singapore's 14th-century settlement is no longer disputed. Even so, as De Jong argued in his article The Character of Malay Annals, the stories of the Malay Annals could have been realistically mixed with the historical figures and events.

== Biography ==
Sang Nila Utama was a Prince of Palembang, born to King Sang Sapurba, supposed descendant of Rajendra I through his interpretation in Islamic legend as Iskandar Zulkarnain and the pseudo-mythical ancestor to many monarchs and chiefs of the Malay world. He was wed to Princess Wan Sri Bini, the daughter of Permaisuri Iskandar Syah, the Queen of the Kingdom of Bentan on Bintan Island, and received high honours comprising a golden crown studded with precious stones and a royal signet ring indicating his authority. He held the title Chakravatin of Indo-pura during his reign

=== Discovery of Temasek ===
According to the Malay Annals, the emporium of Singapore was founded by Sang Nila Utama. While hunting on Bintan, he spotted a stag and started chasing it up a small hill but, when he reached the top, the stag vanished. He then came to a very large rock and decided to climb it. When he stood on top of the rock, he looked across the sea and saw another island with a white sandy beach which had the appearance of a white sheet of cloth. Asking his chief minister what island it was, he was told that it was the island of Temasek (now known as Singapore). While his ship was out at sea, a great storm erupted and the ship was tossed about in the huge waves and began to take in water. To prevent it from sinking, his men threw all the heavy things on board into the sea to lighten the ship. But still water kept entering the ship. On the advice of the ship's captain, he threw his crown overboard as a gift to the sea. At once, the storm died down and he reached Temasek safely.

He landed safely on the beach, and went to hunt wild animals near the river mouth on a patch of open ground, now referred to as the Padang. Suddenly, he saw a strange animal with a red body, black head and a white breast, which swiftly disappeared into the jungle. Impressed by this beast's beauty, he asked his chief minister Demang Lebar Daun what animal it was and was informed that it was a lion. Pleased with this as he believed it to be a good omen, he decided to build his new city in Temasek. He and his men stayed on the island and founded a city, renaming the island to Singapura, which in Sanskrit means "Lion City".

== Personal life ==
Sang Nila Utama fathered two sons with Wan Sri Bini, born Raja Kechil-Besar and Raja Kechil-Muda the elder son was married to Nila Panchadi, a princess from India and the younger was married to his cousin, a granddaughter of Demang Lebar Dawn. After ruling Singapura for 48 years, Sang Nila Utama died in 1347 and Raja Kechil-Besar ascended to the throne as Sri Wikrama Wira, becoming the second Raja of Singapura; Kechil-Muda was appointed his prime minister and Bendahara of its port. Sang Nila Utama was buried on Bukit Larangan, now known as Fort Canning Hill; the exact location of his grave is unknown, although the altar at Keramat Iskandar Shah may share a site with the royal burials atop the hill.

== Interpretation ==
The events in the tale of Sang Nila Utama are highly symbolic and are unlikely to be sober retellings of historical events. The casting of the crown into the sea, an action imbued with symbolic meaning as "sovereignty" in the Malay world relied strongly on ceremony and attire, could represent the shift of power from Palembang to Singapura as the new centre of power for the Malay kings.

It has been pointed out that lions have never lived in Singapore (not even Asiatic lions), and the beast seen by Sang Nila Utama was therefore suggested to be a tiger, most likely to be the Malayan tiger. Another candidate for the beast mentioned in the Malay Annals is mythical beast called janggi told in Minangkabau legends as a guardian of gold mines. Dark red hair called rambut janggi, said to be of this mythical beast but probably actually from orangutans, adorn lances that were kept by the Minangkabaus as heirlooms. Regardless of the exact species of animal, the symbolism of the Asiatic lion as an emblem of power was strongly established through the spread of Buddhist culture in Southeast Asia.

There are however a number of other theories about the origin of the name Singapura, with the earliest attestation of any variant of the name being the Ramayana. It has been suggested that the "lion" refers to the lion throne originally set up by Parameswara in Palembang as a challenge to the Majapahit Empire, while others believed that the "lion" refers to a Majapahit Buddhist sect. With regards to the historicity of settlement on Singapore itself, it remains debated if a 3rd-century Chinese account of a locality named Pu Luo Zhong refers to the main island of Singapore, Pulau Ujong. Nevertheless, other settlements such as Long Ya Men and Ban Zu on the island of Dan Ma Xi (assumed to be a transliteration of Temasek), along with their governance by local rulers, are recorded by the Yuan Dynasty Chinese traveller Wang Dayuan in his Daoyi Zhilue and later Ming Dynasty records.

=== Identification with Parameswara ===
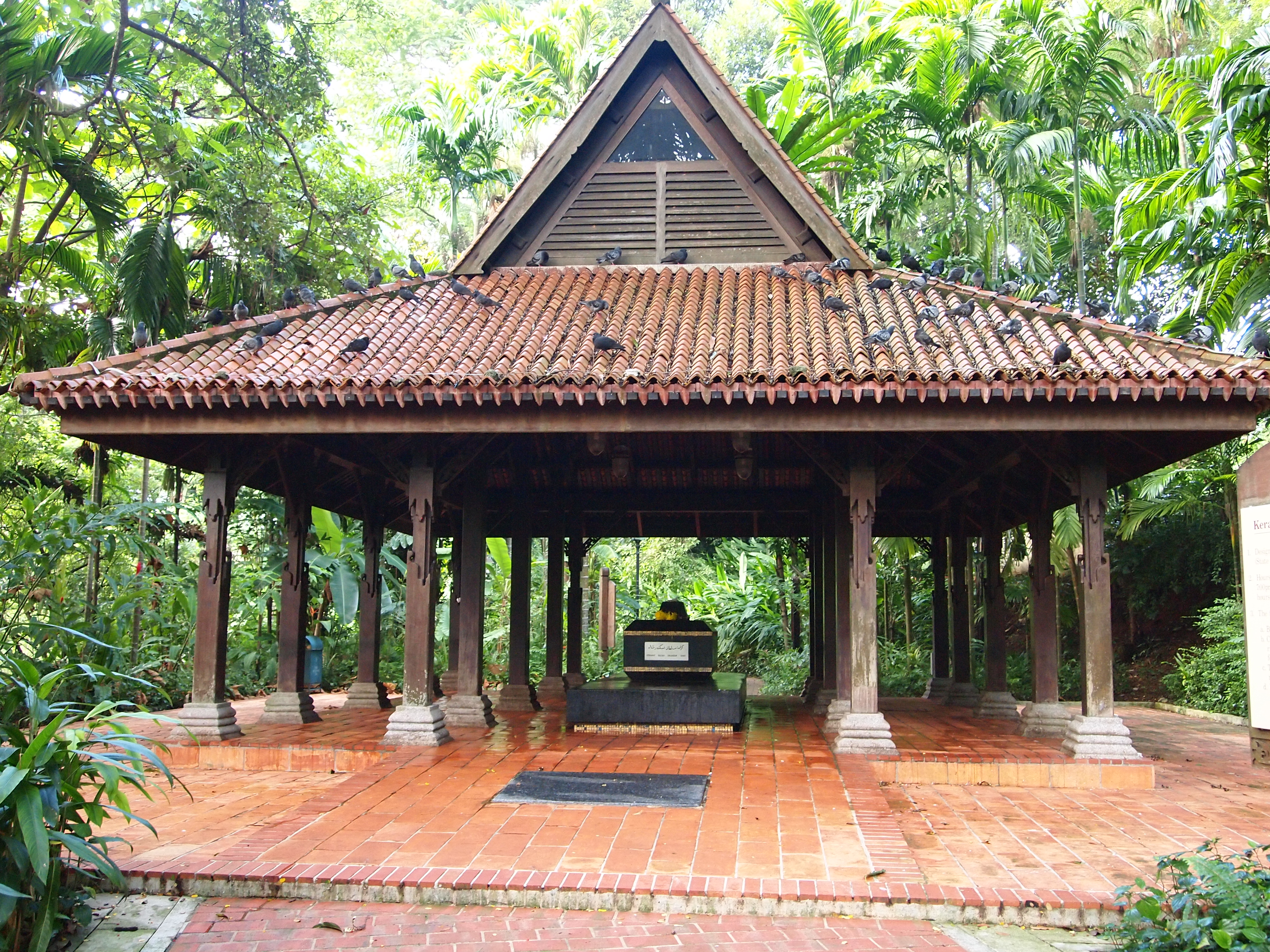
A keramat erected on Fort Canning Hill to memorialise Iskandar Shah, the last Raja of Singapura commonly identified with Parameswara due to commonalities in their biographies.

Although the archaeology of Singapore has lain rest to the idea that its 14th-century history is wholly fictional, it has been suggested that the figure of Sang Nila Utama himself, with his illustrious genealogy and fantastic deeds, was a literary device intended to cover up the ignominious history of the founder of Melaka, the Sultan Parameswara. As related in the Suma Oriental of Tome Pires, there are striking similarities between the biographies of both individuals, namely their birth in Palembang, and founding (or usurpation) of Singapore. Confusing matters further is that "Parameswara", deriving from the Sanskrit for "Supreme Lord", was a highly popular title amongst contemporary rulers both in mainland and archipelagic Southeast Asia.

Parameswara's rule, unlike Sang Nila Utama's, involves deceit and treachery, namely assassinating its local ruler after enjoying his hospitality for nine days, and unlike Sri Tri Buana's illustrious settlement is terminated almost immediately by the Siamese superiors of this murdered chieftain. The conquest of Singapore forces him to flee to the Malay Peninsula, eventually leading to the establishment of the Melaka Sultanate; the destruction of Singapore is instead blamed on a king known as Iskandar Shah, the fifth Raja of Singapura and fourth successor to Sang Nila Utama, and the island's conquerors are identified as Javanese of Majapahit.

These differences may reflect ideological differences in their sources; Pires named a "Javanese chronicle" as his source for Parameswara's biography, and is therefore more likely to have transmitted biases among the Majapahit against their Sumatran predecessors in Palembang, whereas the Malay Annals seek to highlight historical connections between the Kingdom of Singapura and its successor states of the Melaka Sultanate and the Johor Sultanate, promoting the legitimacy of its contemporary publishers in Johore. It is therefore unclear as to whether Singapore's 14th-15th century archaeology thus reflects five generations' worth of trade and exchange begun by Sang Nila Utama, or the Majapahit world-order and its brief disruption by Parameswara.

== Uncertainty over the date of founding ==
The Malay Annals (Sejarah Melayu) does not actually give any dates for Singapura. The Raffles 18 manuscript (MS. 18) is the sole Sejarah Melayu manuscript to give any form of indication through its statement of the durations of reigns of every king from Sang Nila Utama to Sultan Mahmud Shah (r. 1488–1511, 1513–1528) of Melaka, who reportedly abdicated in favour of his son, Sultan Ahmad, shortly before the city fell to the Portuguese conquest of 1511. Working backwards from this historical date using the total length of rule of all the kings (350 years on the Islamic calendar adopted by the Melaka kingdom and its successor Johor, or about 339 years on the Gregorian calendar), one finds that Sang Nila Utama was installed as ruler of Palembang circa 1172. Raffles suggested the date of 1160 for Singapura's founding, which was actually taken from Francois Valentijn, who determined in 1724 that this was when Sri Tri Buana (a title associated with Sang Nila Utama) was crowned in Palembang. Valentijn had used a list of kings available to him that disclosed the stated reign durations of a line of Malay rulers of Singapura, Melaka, and Johor, that ended with Sultan Abdul Jalil Shah IV (r. 1699–1720). However, Valentijn wrongly used solar years as the unit of his calculation–the Malays followed the Islamic calendar–but his compatriot Petrus van der Vorm realised this and arrived, from the same information, at the year 1177. In any case, 1299 or 1300 is not the answer.

The 1299 was not a date from the Sejarah Melayu but a proposition made by William Linehan in 1947. The colonial historian had assumed Parameswara to be Iskandar Shah, the fifth and last king of Singapura described in Sejarah Melayu. Taking a Chinese announcement of Parameswara’s death in 1414, and considering it to have happened the year before (i.e. 1413), Linehan worked backwards using the combined duration of reigns of the five Singapura kings in the Raffles 18 (114 years) to arrive that Sang Nila Utama was made king in 1299.

Linehan's theory was long discredited by Wang Gungwu's verification that Parameswara and Iskandar Shah were not the same persons, but father and son, as the Ming dynasty records stated. The Chinese reported Iskandar Shah's death in 1424.

Sang Nila Utama House of Sang Sapurba
Regnal titles
Preceded by Position established	Raja of Singapura; 1299–1347	Succeeded by Sri Wikrama Wira
