= Kingdom of Singapura =

Malay island kingdom

Coordinates: 1.3°N 103.8°E

Kingdom of Singapura Kerajaan Singapura
- 1299–1398
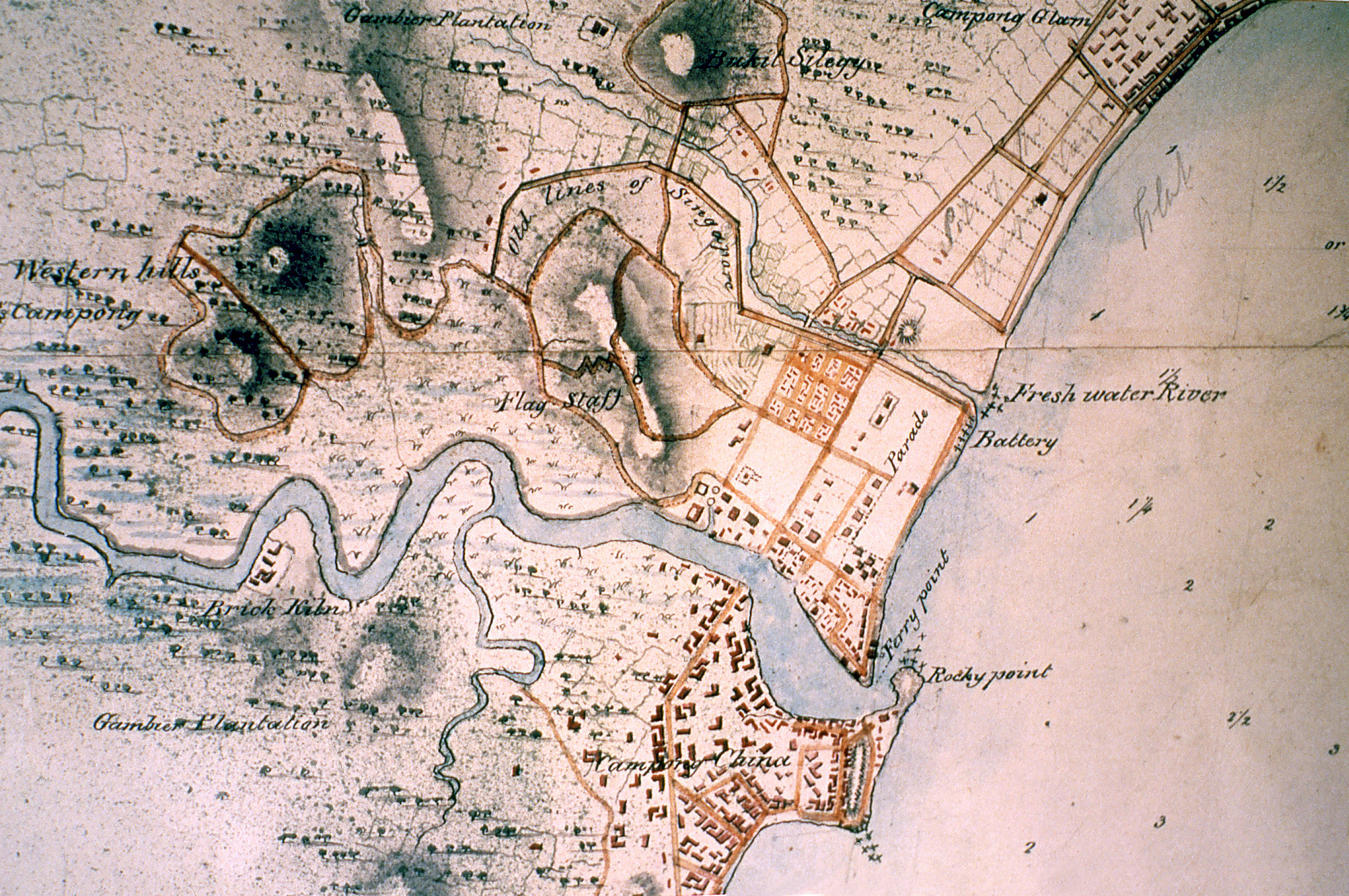
- Kingdom of Singapore, with ruins of an old wall still visible in 1825 and marked on this map.
- Capital: Singapura
- Common languages: Old Malay
- Religion: Hinduism; Buddhism; Islam (later period)
- Government: Absolute monarchy
- Raja
  - 1299–1347: Sang Nila Utama (Sri Tri Buana)
  - 1347–1362: Sri Wikrama Wira
  - 1362–1375: Sri Rana Wikrama
  - 1375–1389: Sri Maharaja
  - 1389–1398: Parameswara (Iskandar Shah)
- History
  - Founding of Temasek by Sang Nila Utama: 1299
  - Siege by Siamese forces: 1330
  - Siege by Majapahit under Hayam Wuruk: 1350
  - Majapahit invasion and escape of Parameswara to the Malay Peninsula: 1398
Preceded by	Succeeded by
Melayu Kingdom; Temasek	Malacca Sultanate; Majapahit
- Today part of: Singapore

The Kingdom of Singapura (Malay: Kerajaan Singapura) was a Malay polity believed to have been founded as a Hindu–Buddhist kingdom during the early history of Singapore on the island of Temasek, lasting from 1299 until its decline and fall between 1396 and 1398. Conventional view marks c. 1299 as the founding year of the kingdom by Sang Nila Utama (also known as "Sri Tri Buana"), whose father is Sang Sapurba, a semi-divine figure who according to legend is the ancestor of several Malay monarchs in the Malay world.

The historicity of this kingdom based on the account given in the Malay Annals is uncertain and many historians only consider its last ruler, the Muslim convert Parameswara (or Sri Iskandar Shah), to be a historically attested figure in his role as the first ruler of the Malacca Sultanate. Archaeological evidence from Fort Canning Hill and the nearby banks of the Singapore River has nevertheless demonstrated the existence of a thriving settlement and a trade port in the 14th century, corroborating the eyewitness testimony of Yuan dynasty sojourner Wang Dayuan concerning the settlements of Long Ya Men and Ban Zu upon Temasek.

The settlement developed in the 13th or 14th century and transformed from a small trading outpost into a bustling center of international commerce, facilitating trade networks that linked the Malay Archipelago, India and the Yuan dynasty. It was however claimed by two regional powers at that time, the Ayuthaya from the north and the Majapahit from the south. As a result, the kingdom's fortified capital was attacked by at least two major foreign invasions before it was finally sacked by Majapahit in 1398 according to the Malay Annals or by the Siamese according to Portuguese sources. The last king, Parameswara, fled to the west coast of the Malay Peninsula to establish the Malacca Sultanate in 1400.

== Etymology ==
The name Singapura is derived from Sanskrit meaning "Lion City". Singa comes from the Sanskrit word siṃha, which means "lion", and pūra means "city" in Sanskrit. According to the Malay Annals, Sang Nila Utama and his men were exploring Tanjong Bemban while in Bintan when he spotted an island with white sandy beach from a high point. On learning that the island was called Temasek, they set sail for the island, but encountered a severe storm on the way. After they managed to land safely on the island, they went to hunt for wild animals. He suddenly saw a strange animal with a red body, black head and a white neck breast. It was a fine-looking animal and moved with great speed as it disappeared into the jungle. He asked his chief minister, Demang Lebar Daun, what animal it was, and was told that it probably was an Asiatic lion. He then decided to stay in Temasek, named the city he founded Singapura or "Lion City".

Some scholars believe that Sang Nila Utama and the story of its founding to be fictional, and a number of alternative suggestions for the origin of the name of Singapore have been given. For example, it has been proposed that the name Singapura was adopted by Parameswara as an indication that he was re-establishing in Temasek the lion throne that he had originally set up in Palembang as a challenge to the Javanese Majapahit Empire. In this version of events, Parameswara had assassinated the local ruler of Temasek and usurped the throne, and changed the name of Temasek to strengthen the legitimacy of his claim over the island. Others linked the name to the Javanese kingdom of Singhasari as well as a Majapahit Buddhist sect whose adherents were referred to as lions. Although it is believed that the name Singapura replaced Temasek some time in the 14th century, the origin of the name cannot be determined with certainty.

== Historiography ==
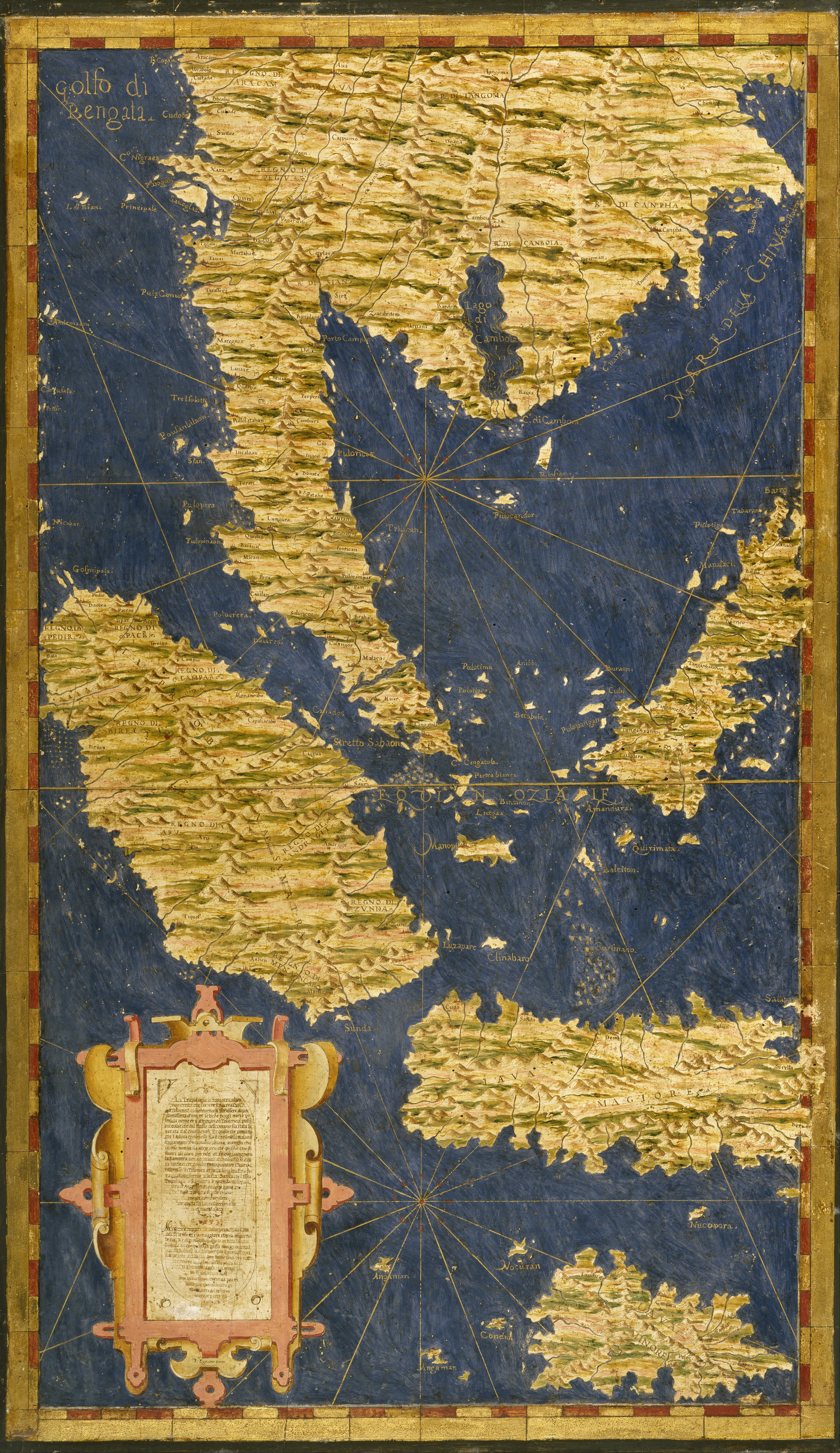
The 1573 map by Egnazio Danti showing Cingatola as an island located on the tip of Regio di Malaca.

The only comprehensive account of Singapore's history during the early modern period is the Malay Annals. These were written and compiled during the height of the Malacca Sultanate and re-compiled in 1612 by the court of the Johor Sultanate. It is the basis for accounts of its founding, the succession of rulers and its decline. As no specific date is given in the Malay Annals, the chronology of the history of the Kingdom of Singapura as set out in the Malay Annals is calculated from the date of death of Parameswara given in the Ming Veritable Records. While various aspects of the accounts of the Malacca and Johor sultanates given in the Malay Annals are relatively accurate, the same can not be said for the Kingdom of Singapura for which there is little corroborating evidence for large part of its accounts. Historians are therefore generally in doubt over the historicity of the kingdom as described in the semi-historical Malay Annals, nevertheless some consider Singapura to be a significant polity that existed between the decline of Srivijaya and the rise of Malacca. Some also argued that the author of the Malay Annals, whose purpose is to legitimise the claim of descent from the Palembang ruling house, invented the five kings of Singapura to gloss over an inglorious period of its history. However, Iskandar Shah/Parameswara, the last ruler of Singapura and founder of the Malacca Sultanate, is a figure that could be considered factual.

Accounts of Singapura in its final years are also briefly given in Portuguese sources, such as those by Tomé Pires, Brás de Albuquerque (who published letters by his father Afonso de Albuquerque), Godinho de Erédia, and João de Barros. For example, the Suma Oriental, written shortly after the Portuguese conquest of Malacca, briefly mentions Singapura in relation to the foundation of Malacca. Both the Suma Oriental and the Malay Annals contain similar stories about a fleeing Palembang prince who arrived and lay claim to Singapura, and about the last king of Singapura who fled to the west coast of the Malay Peninsula to found Malacca. However, both accounts differ markedly as the Suma Oriental identifies the fleeing prince and the last king of Singapura as Parameswara. In contrast, the Malay Annals identifies the fleeing prince and the last king as two different people separated by five generations, Sang Nila Utama and Iskandar Shah respectively. The Suma Oriental noted further that the fleeing Palembang prince assassinated the local ruler "Temagi" or "Sang Aji" and usurped the throne of Singapura sometimes around the 1390s, and Parameswara then ruled Singapura for five years with the help of the Çelates or Orang Laut.

Portuguese sources named Iskandar Shah as Parameswara's son, Chinese Ming dynasty sources similar named Iskandar Shah as the second ruler of Malacca. Many modern scholars believe Parameswara to be the same person as Iskandar Shah, and some scholars argued that they were mistaken as two different people due to Parameswara changing his name to Iskandar Shah after he converted to Islam. There are however other opinions, and many now accept Megat Iskandar Shah as the son of Parameswara.

The only known first-hand account of 14th-century Singapore is found in the descriptions of a place called Danmaxi (commonly identified with Temasek in Chinese transliteration) recorded by Wang Dayuan in the Daoyi Zhilüe, a chronicle of his travels. It indicates that Temasek was ruled by a local chief during Wang's visit around 1330, however the word used (酋長, "tribal chief") by Wang indicates that the ruler may not have been independent, rather he was a vassal of another more powerful state. Wang also mentioned that the Siamese attacked the fortified city of Temasek with around 70 ships a few years before he visited, but Temasek successfully resisted the attack which lasted a month. Other settlements on the island recorded by Wang are Long Ya Men (identified with Keppel Harbour) and Ban Zu (possibly a Chinese transliteration of the Malay Pancur, or a sacred spring on Fort Canning Hill); the exact relationship between these settlements is unknown.

=== Archaeological evidence ===
Although the existence of the kingdom as described in the Malay Annals is debatable, archaeological excavations on Fort Canning and its vicinity along the banks of the Singapore River since 1984 by John Miksic have confirmed the presence of a thriving settlement and a trade port there during the 14th century. Remnants of a wall of significant size (described by John Crawfurd as around five metres wide and three metres high) and unique to the region were found inland along present day Stamford Road. Excavations also found evidence of structures built on what is now Fort Canning Hill, along with evidence of fruit orchards and terraces. Local lore when the British arrived in the early 1800s associated it with the royalty of ancient Singapura where its last ruler was buried, and the hill was known to them as the Forbidden Hill (Bukit Larangan), as it was the site of spirits. In 1928, a cache of gold ornaments was found by workers excavating the hill for the Fort Canning Reservoir, including a pair of near-identical flexible armlets, a finger ring inscribed with a bird-like motif, three pairs of circular rings (perhaps earrings), an elliptical ornament, and a jewelled clasp with a disc-and-conch motif. Most of these were lost during the Japanese occupation of Singapore in the Second World War, and only one of the armbands and two of the circular rings remain. Numerous fragments of ceramics, porcelain, and other objects have been found at three different locations around the Singapore River and Fort Canning Hill, with those from Fort Canning Hill of a higher quality than the others, offering further evidence that it was the residence of the elites, all of which supports the notion that Singapore was a political and commercial center in the 14th century.

== History ==
Historic Indosphere cultural influence zone of Greater India for transmission of elements of Indian elements such as the honorific titles, naming of people, naming of places, mottos of organisations and educational institutes as well as adoption of Hinduism, Buddhism, Indian architecture, martial arts, Indian music and dance, traditional Indian clothing, and Indian cuisine, a process which has also been aided by the ongoing historic expansion of Indian diaspora.

The primary source concerning the history of the rulers of Singapura are the Malay Annals, and the rest of this section is mainly built upon reconstructions from its text, although corroborating evidence is scarce and its polemic nature suggests against literal interpretations of this chronicle. Other sources include the Yuan dynasty merchant Wang Dayuan's compendium known as the Daoyi Zhilüe, Trần dynasty annals, Portuguese apothecary Tomé Pires' Suma Oriental and scattered references in the Majapahit Nagarakretagama and the 16th-century Javanase court poem, Pararaton; as well as Ming records such as the Yuanshi.

=== Sang Nila Utama ===
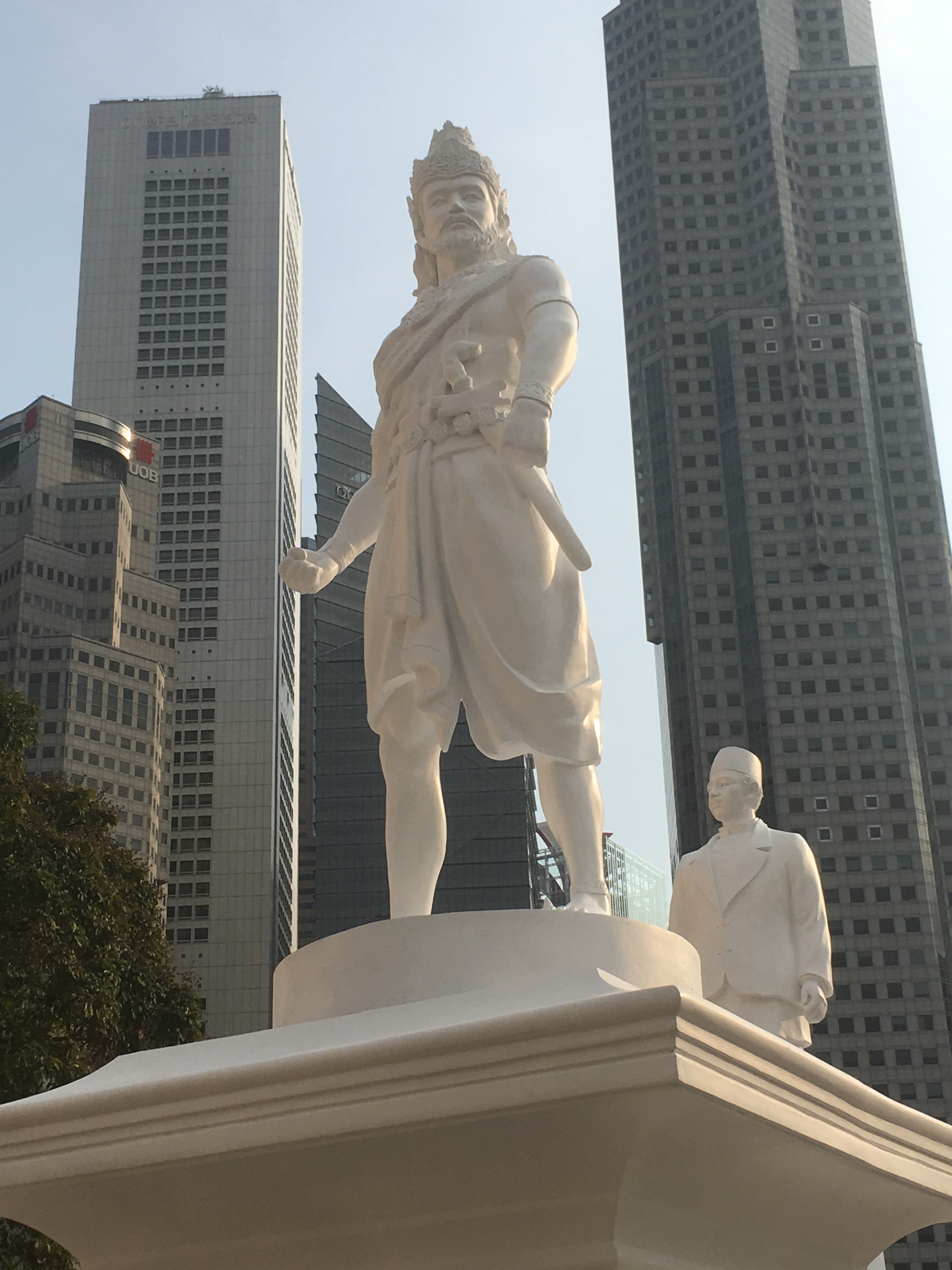
Statue of Sang Nila Utama at the Raffles' Landing Site.

According to the Malay Annals, a fleeing Palembang prince named Sang Nila Utama, who claimed to be a descendant of Alexander the Great (via his Islamic interpretation as Iskandar Zulkarnain), took refuge on Bintan Island for several years before he set sail and landed on Temasek in 1299. In this era, Temasek was a small trading outpost and primarily inhabited by Orang Laut seafarers. Historically, these Orang Laut were very loyal to the Malay kings, patrolling adjacent seas and repelling other petty pirates, directing traders to their Malay overlords' ports and maintaining those ports' dominance in the area. These Orang Laut eventually declared him Raja ("king"), and Sang Nila Utama renamed Temasek as Singapura and founded his capital around the mouth of the Singapore River.

The area was suitable for a new settlement due to the nearby presence of a spring and a hill. The fresh water from a spring on the hill's slope served both as a bathing place for royalty and, at the base of a hill, a source of fresh water for the populace. The hill (modern-day Fort Canning Hill) itself represented Mount Meru, the seat of the gods in Hindu-Buddhist mythology, which was associated with kingship and divinity in ancient Southeast Asian culture. Building a palace on a hill would have helped Sang Nila Utama to assert his role as a semi-divine ruler.

The king styled himself as Sri Tri Buana, or "The Lord of Three Worlds", indicating authority over the universe. Within a few decades, the small settlement grew into a thriving cosmopolitan city serving as a port of call for richly laden trade ships traveling through the Malacca Straits region. The Malay Annals mention that supplies of workers, horses and elephants were sent from Bintan by the king's adoptive mother, Permaisuri Iskandar Syah, the Queen of the Kingdom of Bentan on Bintan Island.

It was during this period that contacts with Yuan dynasty China were established. It was recorded that in 1320, Yuan China sent envoys to Long Ya Men (thought by some to stretch from modern-day Keppel Harbour south to the northwestern side of Sentosa and west to what is today the Labrador Nature Reserve) "to obtain tame elephants", and the natives of Long Ya Men returned with tributes and a trade mission to China in 1325.

Long Ya Men was part of Temasek (the Kingdom of Singapura) according to Chinese traveler Wang Dayuan who visited Temasek in the 1330s and wrote an account of his travel in the Daoyi Zhilüe. He describes Temasek as comprising two settlements – "Ban Zu" (after the Malay word "pancur" or fresh-water spring), a peaceful trading port city under the rule of the king. The second settlement he describes as an area surrounding the "Long-ya-men", which was occupied by ferocious pirates who launched frequent attacks on passing merchant ships. He also notes that Chinese traders lived there, "side by side with the natives". He also mentions some of the trade goods bartered in Singapura: red gold, cotton prints, blue satin, lakawood and fine hornbill casques.

The Siamese attempted to subjugate the island kingdom in this period. According to Wang's account, possibly a few years before he visited Temasek in the 1330s, a Siamese fleet consisting of 70 junks descended upon the island kingdom and launched an attack. The moated and heavily fortified city managed to withstand the siege of the Siamese for a month until the Siamese fleet withdrew with the arrival of a Yuan dynasty imperial envoy.

=== Sri Wikrama Wira ===
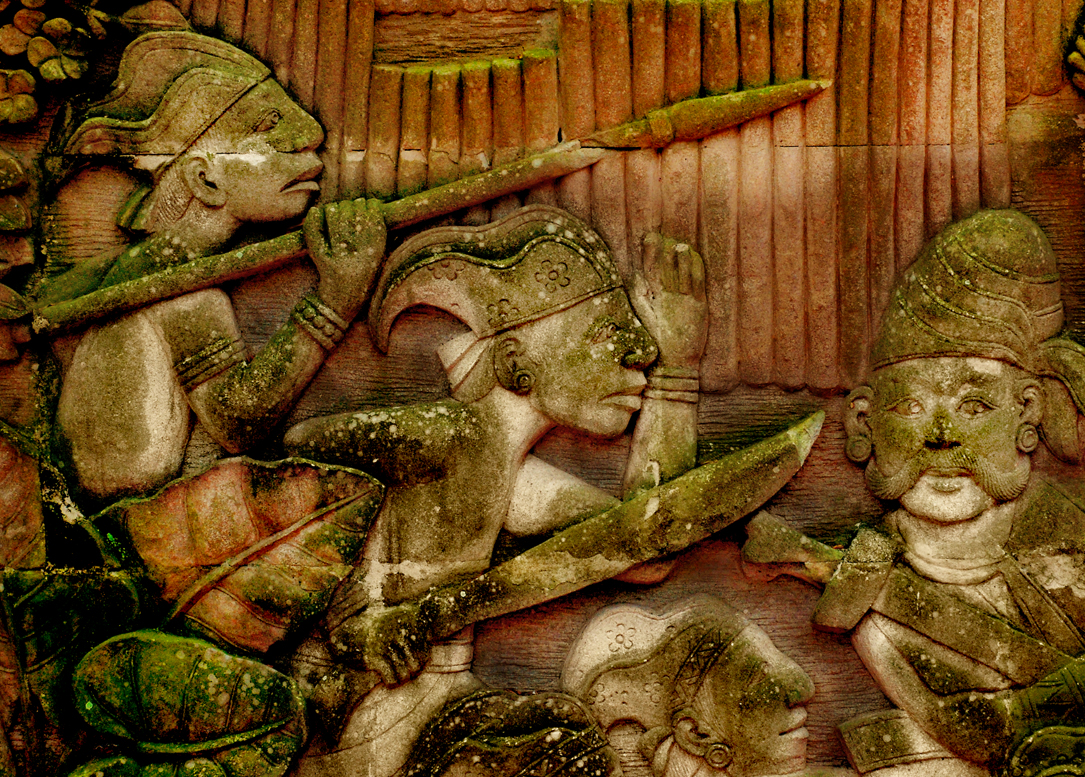
Depiction of Malay warriors of ancient Singapura on a relief in Fort Canning Park, Singapore.

In 1347, Sri Teri Buana was succeeded by Sri Wikrama Wira. His reign was marked by the first attempt by Siam to subdue Singapura. As recorded by Wang Dayuan in 1349, a Siamese fleet of 70 jongs arrived at Singapura. The heavily fortified city withstood a siege until the fleet fled with the arrival of Chinese ships.

The increasingly powerful Javanese kingdom of Majapahit, the successor of Singhasari, began eyeing the growing influence of the tiny island kingdom. Under the leadership of its ambitious warlord, Gajah Mada, Majapahit started to embark on overseas expansions against all kingdoms of the Malay Archipelago. In 1350, Hayam Wuruk ascended to the throne of Majapahit. The new king sent an envoy to Singapura demanding the submission of the kingdom. Wikrama Wira refused to do so and even sent a symbolic message threatening to shave the Majapahit king's head should he proceed to Singapura.

The furious Majapahit king ordered an invasion with a fleet of 100 main warships (jong) and many smaller vessels under the command of Damang Wiraja. The fleet passed through the island of Bintan, from where the news spread to Singapura. The defenders immediately assembled 400 warboats to face the invasion. Both sides clashed on the coast of Singapura in a battle that took place over three days and three nights. Many were killed on both sides and in the evening of the third day, the Javanese were driven back to their ships.

=== Sri Rana Wikrama ===
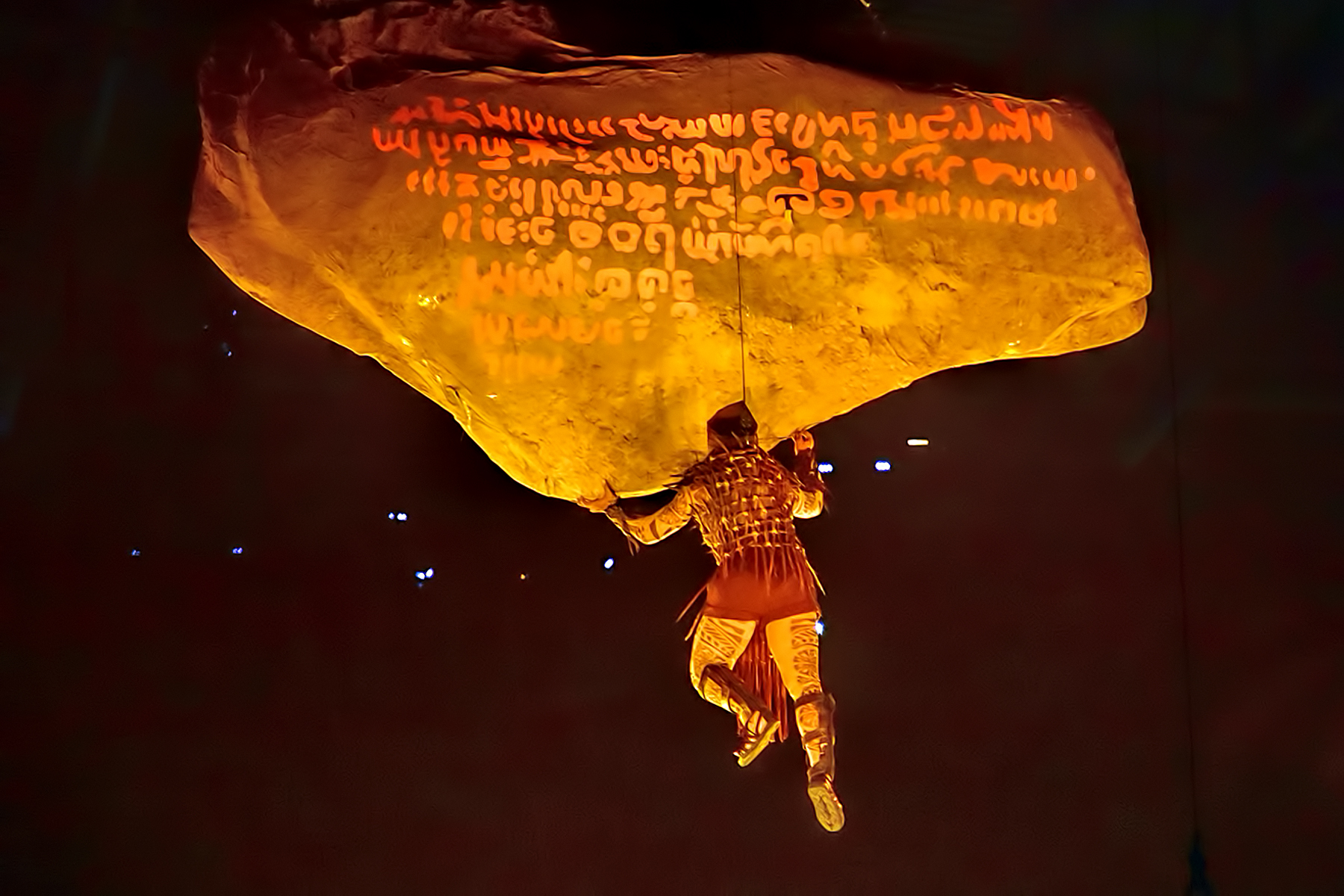
A depiction of the legendary strongman Badang lifting the Singapore Stone at National Day Parade 2016.

Sri Wikrama Wira died in 1362 and succeeded by his son, Sri Rana Wikrama. Despite the failure in the previous campaign, the Javanese chronicle Nagarakretagama lists Singapura as a subject of Majapahit in 1365. During his reign, Sri Rana Wikrama established a diplomatic ties with a Sumatran Peureulak Sultanate. It was during the reign of Sri Rana Wikrama that, the legendary Badang, was said to have demonstrated his feat of strength in Rana Wikrama's court, including casting the Singapore Stone to its location at the mouth of the Singapore River, where it stood until it was demolished by the British East India Company.

=== Sri Maharaja ===
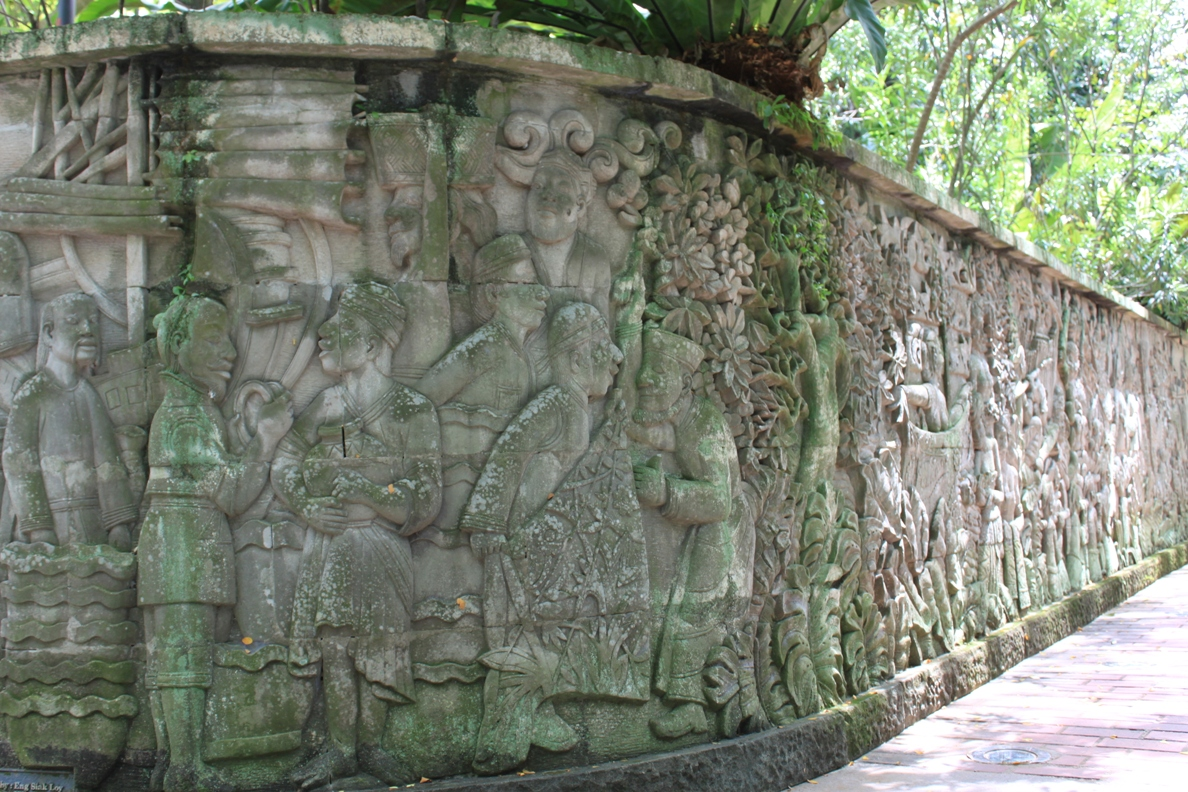
Carved mural on a wall in Fort Canning Park depicting activities which may have occurred in 14th-15th century Singapore.

In 1375, Rana Wikrama was succeeded by his son Sri Maharaja. According to the Malay Annals, the reign of Sri Maharaja was marked with the event of todak (garfish) ravaging the coast of Singapura. A young boy, Hang Nadim, thought of an ingenious solution to fend off the todak by planting banana plants along the shoreline, where they would get stuck whilst leaping out of the water. The king was initially grateful, but felt increasingly envious of the attention the boy's intelligence was garnering, and ordered to have the boy executed.

=== Iskandar Shah (Parameswara) ===
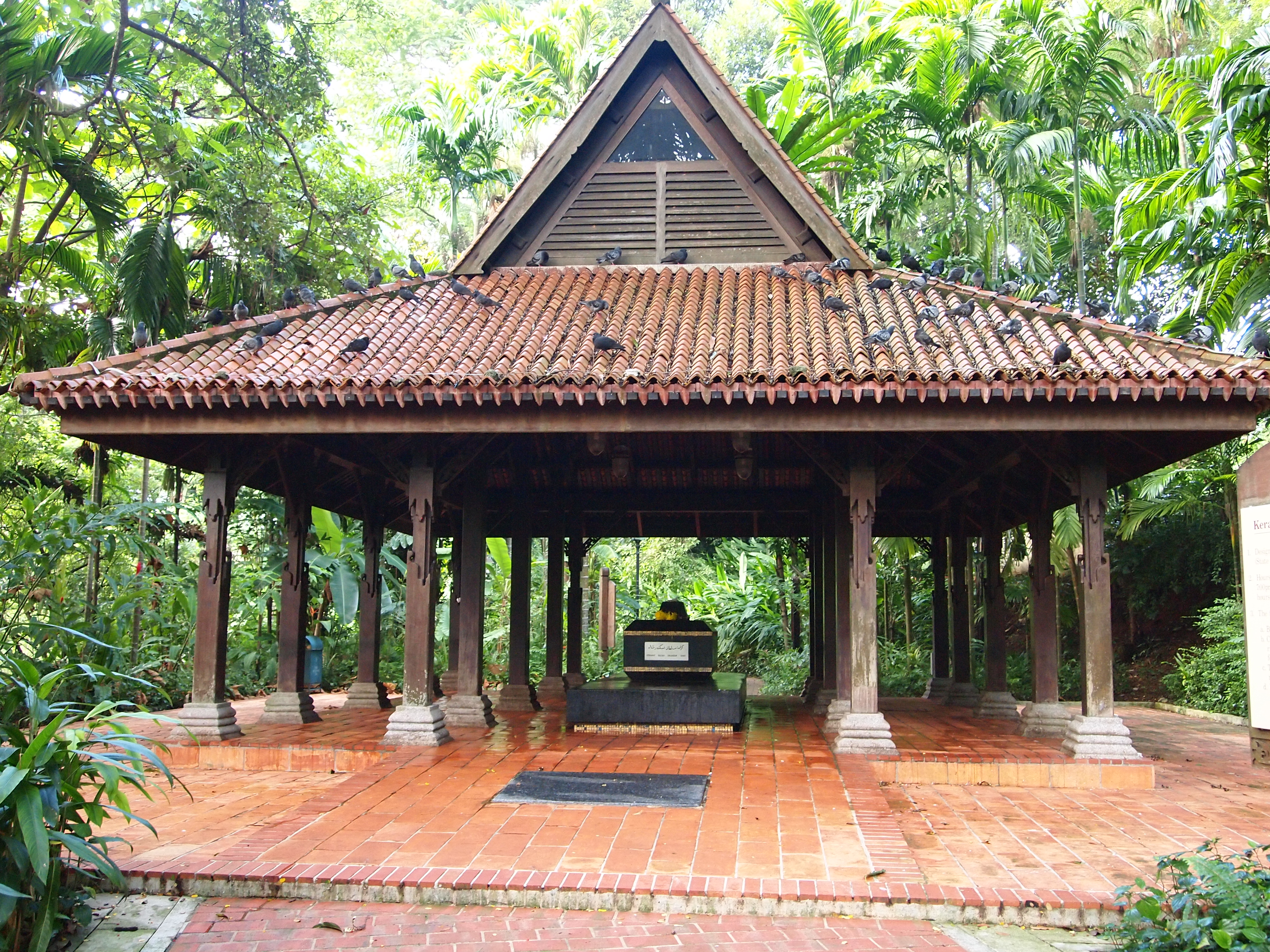
A keramat erected on Fort Canning Hill to memorialise Iskandar Shah, the last Raja of Singapura.

In 1387, Paduka Sri Maharaja was succeeded by Iskandar Shah, commonly identified as the king Parameswara mentioned in the Suma Oriental of Tomé Pires. Based on his Persian name and title, it is believed that Iskandar Shah was the first king of Singapura to embrace Islam. Portuguese accounts by Pires however, suggested that the Iskandar Shah mentioned in his text (and said to be Parameswara's son) only converted when he was 72 as the ruler of Malacca.

==== Fall of Singapura and establishment of Malacca ====
As mentioned in the Malay Annals, the story of the fall of Singapura and the flight of its last king begins with Iskandar Shah's accusing one of his concubines of adultery. As punishment, the king had her stripped naked in public. In revenge, the concubine's father, Sang Rajuna Tapa who was also an official in Iskandar Shah's court, secretly sent a message to the king of Majapahit, pledging his support should the king choose to invade Singapura. In 1398, Majapahit dispatched a fleet of 300 jong and hundreds of smaller vessels (of kelulus, pelang, and jongkong), carrying no fewer than 200,000 men.

The Javanese soldiers engaged with the defenders in a battle outside the fortress, before forcing them to retreat behind the walls. The invasion force laid siege to the city and repeatedly tried to attack the fortress. However the fortress proved to be impregnable. After about a month passed, the food in the fortress began to run low and the defenders were on the verge of starvation. Sang Rajuna Tapa was then asked to distribute whatever grain left to the people from the royal store. Seeing this opportunity for revenge, the minister lied to the King, saying the stores were empty. The grain was not distributed and the people eventually starved. The final assault came when the gates were finally opened under the order of the minister. Knowing that defeat was imminent, Iskandar Shah and his followers fled the island. The Majapahit soldiers rushed into the fortress and a terrible massacre ensued. According to the Malay Annals, "blood flowed like a river" and the red stains on the laterite soil of Singapore are said to be blood from that massacre.

Portuguese sources give a significantly different account of the life of last ruler of Singapura. These accounts named the last ruler of Singapura and founder of Malacca as Parameswara, a name also found in Ming annals. It is generally believed that the Iskandar Shah of the Malay Annals is the same person as Parameswara. However, Portuguese accounts and Ming sources indicate that Iskandar Shah was the son of Parameswara who became the second ruler of Malacca, and some therefore argued that Megat Iskandar Shah was the son of Parameswara. According to the Portuguese accounts, Parameswara was a prince from Palembang who attempted to challenge Javanese rule over Palembang sometime after 1360. The Javanese then attacked and drove Parameswara out of Palembang. Parameswara escaped to Singapura, and was welcomed by its ruler of with the title Sang Aji named Sangesinga. Parameswara assassinated the local ruler after 8 days, then ruled Singapura for five years with the help of the Çelates or Orang Laut. He was however driven out by the Thais, possibly as a punishment for killing the Sang Aji whose wife may have been from the Kingdom of Patani.

=== Family Tree of the House of Sang Sapurba ===
Sri Tri Buana (r. 1299–1347)
Sri Wikrama Wira (r. 1347–1362)
Sri Rana Wikrama (r. 1362–1375)
Sri Maharaja (r. 1375–1389)
Parameswara (as King of Singapura r. 1389–1398, as Sultan of Malacca r. 1402–1414)
Sultans of Malacca (1402–1513)

=== Question over the 1299 date ===
The Sejarah Melayu does not actually give any dates for Singapura. The Raffles 18 manuscript (MS. 18) is the sole Sejarah Melayu manuscript to give any form of indication through its statement of the durations of reigns of every king from Sang Nila Utama to Sultan Mahmud Shah (r.1488–1511, 1513–1528) of Melaka, who reportedly abdicated in favour of his son, Sultan Ahmad, shortly before the city fell to the Portuguese conquest of 1511. Working backwards from this historical date using the total length of rule of all the kings (350 years on the Islamic calendar adopted by the Melaka kingdom and its successor Johor, or about 339 years on the Gregorian calendar), one finds that Sang Nila Utama was installed as ruler of Palembang circa 1172. Raffles suggested the date of 1160 for Singapura's founding, which was actually taken from Francois Valentijn, who determined in 1724 that this was when Sri Tri Buana (a title associated with Sang Nila Utama) was crowned in Palembang. Valentijn had used a list of kings available to him that disclosed the stated reign durations of a line of Malay rulers of Singapura, Melaka, and Johor, that ended with Sultan Abdul Jalil Shah IV (r.1699–1720). However, Valentijn wrongly used solar years as the unit of his calculation–the Malays followed the Islamic calendar–but his compatriot Petrus van der Vorm realised this and arrived, from the same information, at the year 1177. In any case, 1299 or 1300 is not the answer.

The 1299 was not a date from Sejarah Melayu but a proposition made by William Linehan in 1947. The colonial historian had assumed Parameswara to be Iskandar Shah, the fifth and last king of Singapura described in Sejarah Melayu. Taking a Chinese announcement of Parameswara’s death in 1414, and considering it to have happened the year before (i.e. 1413), Linehan worked backwards using the combined duration of reigns of the five Singapura kings in the Raffles 18 (114 years) to arrive that Sang Nila Utama was made king in 1299.

Linehan's theory was long discredited by Wang Gungwu's verification that Parameswara and Iskandar Shah were not the same persons, but father and son, as the Ming dynasty records stated. The Chinese reported Iskandar Shah's death in 1424.

== Administration ==
The Malay Annals provide a well-defined hierarchical structure of Singapura, which was later partly adopted by its successor, Malacca. The highest hierarchical position was the Raja (king) as an absolute monarch. Next to the Raja were the Orang Besar Berempat (four senior nobles) headed by a Bendahara (equivalent to a Grand Vizier) as the highest-ranking officer and the advisor to the King. He was then assisted by three other senior nobles based on the order of precedence namely; Perdana Menteri (prime minister), Penghulu Bendahari (chief of treasurer) and Hulubalang Besar (grand commander).

The Perdana Menteri assisted the Bendahara in administering the internal affairs of the kingdom and usually sat opposite to the Bendahara in the royal court, while the Penghulu Bendahari was responsible for the financial affairs of the kingdom.

The Hulubalang Besar acted as a chief of staff of the army and commanded several other Hulubalangs (commanders), who in turn led smaller military units. The Orang Besar Berempat were assisted by other lower ranking officials titled Orang Besar Caterias, Sida Bentaras and Orang Kayas.

== Trade ==
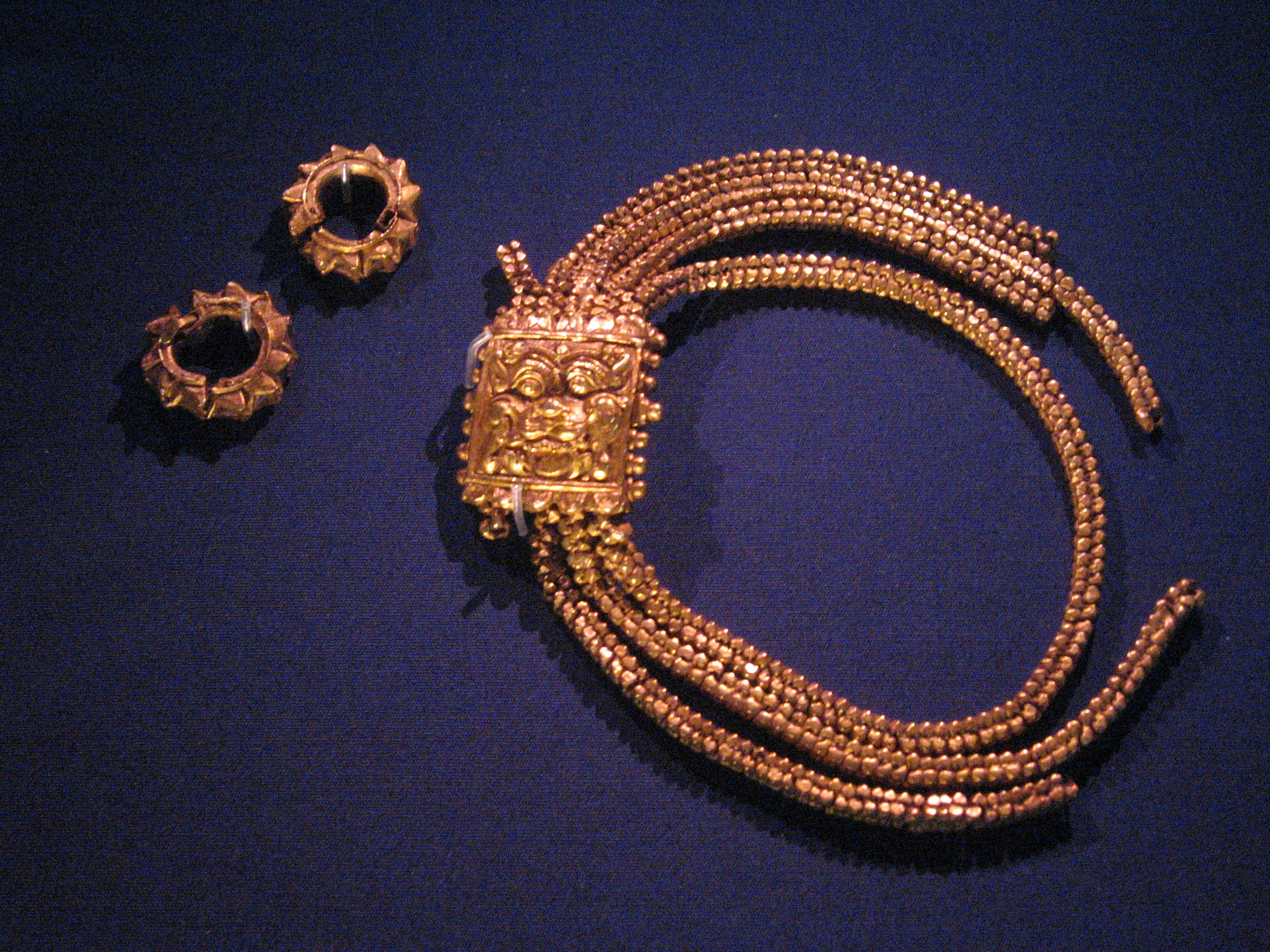
Gold armband with singhamukha and two of the circular ornaments, probably dating to the 14th-century, found in 1928 at Fort Canning Hill, Singapore.

Singapura's rise as a trade-post was concurrent with the era known as Pax Mongolica, where the Mongol Empire's influence over both the overland and maritime Silk Road allowed a new global trading system to develop. Previously, shipping occurred on long-distance routes from the Far East to India or even further west to the Arabian Peninsula, which was relatively costly, risky and time-consuming. However, the new trading system involved the division of the maritime Silk Road into three segments: an Indian Ocean sector linking the Gulf of Aden and the Strait of Hormuz-based Arab traders to India, a Bay of Bengal sector linking the Indian ports with the Strait of Malacca and its associated ports including Singapura and the South China Sea sector linking Southeast Asia with Southern China.

Singapura achieved its significance due to its role as a port. It seems to fit – at least in part – the definition of a port of trade in which trade is less a function of the economy and more a function of government policy; thus trading would have been highly structured and institutionalized, with government agents playing key roles in port activities. Portuguese traders' account in particular, suggest that Singapura operated in such a manner. Reports from merchants of different countries also indicate that Singapura was a point of exchange, rather than a source for goods. Local products were limited in type and mainly consisted of lakawood, tin, hornbill casques (an ivory-like part of the hornbill bird, which was valued for carved ornaments), some wooden items and cotton. Other commonly traded products included a variety of fabrics (cotton and satins), iron rods, iron pots, and porcelains. Chinese traders also reported that there were very few agricultural products due to poor soil. Although these goods were also available from other Southeast Asian ports, those from Singapura were unique in terms of their quality. Singapura also acted as a gateway into the regional and international economic system for its immediate region. South Johor and the Riau Archipelago supplied products to Singapura for export elsewhere, while Singapura was the main source of foreign products to the region. Archaeological artefacts such as ceramics and glassware found in the Riau Archipelago are evidence of this. In addition, cotton was transshipped from Java or India through Singapura.

The increase in activities by Chinese traders seems especially significant for Singapura and its trade. Wang Dayuan indicated that, by this time, there was a Chinese settlement in Singapura living peaceably with the indigenous population.

== Legacy ==
"... have the honour of mixing with those of ashes of Malayan kings ..."

— Sir Stamford Raffles, the founder of the British colony of Singapore, on his desire to be buried upon Fort Canning Hill were he to pass away in Singapore

According to the Malay Annals, after sacking Singapura, the Majapahit army abandoned the city and returned to Java. The city would have been ruined and greatly depopulated. The rivalry between the courts of the Javanese and Malay in the region was renewed a few years later when the last king Iskandar Shah, founded his new stronghold on the mouth of Bertam River on the west coast of the Malay Peninsula. Within decades, the new city grew rapidly to become the capital of Malacca Sultanate and emerged as the primary base in continuing the historic struggles of Singapura against their Java-based rivals. The account by João de Barros suggests that Singapura did not end suddenly after the attack by the Siamese, rather Singapore declined gradually when Parameswara's son Iskandar Shah pushed for trade to move to Malacca instead of Singapura.

As a major entrepot, Malacca attracted Muslim traders from various part of the world and became a centre of Islam, spreading the religion throughout Maritime Southeast Asia. The expansion of Islam into interior Java in the 15th century led to the gradual decline of Hindu-Majapahit before it finally succumbed to the emerging local Muslim forces in the early 16th century. The period spanning from Malaccan era right until the age of European colonisation, saw the domination of Malay-Muslim sultanates in trade and politics that eventually contributed to the Malayisation of the region.

By the mid-15th century, Majapahit found itself unable to control the rising power of Malacca as it began to gain effective control of the Strait of Malacca and expand its influence to Sumatra. Singapura was also absorbed into its realm and once served as the fiefdom of a Melaccan Laksamana. The Johor Sultanate emerged as the dominant power around the Straits of Singapore until it was assimilated into the sphere of influence of the Dutch East India Company; the island of Singapore would not regain autonomy from Johor until Sir Stamford Raffles claimed it and its port for the British East India Company in 1819, deliberately invoking its history as related in the Malay Annals, whose translation by Dr. John Leyden he posthumously published in 1821. The dispute concerning Singapore's legal status, along with other matters arising from British seizure of Dutch colonial possessions during the Napoleonic Wars, was settled by the Anglo-Dutch Treaty of 1824, permanently dividing archipelagic and mainland Southeast Asia.

The independent Republic of Singapore, following the confirmation of its past as the Kingdom of Singapura through its archaeology, has promoted Singapura's history as a regional emporium, showcasing it in the Maritime Experiential Museum on Sentosa and incorporating the chronicle of Sang Nila Utama into its primary school social sciences curriculum. As part of events commemorating the bicentennial of Raffles' claim to Singapore, a statue of Sang Nila Utama has been erected (along with those of other Singaporean pioneers contemporary with Raffles) at the Raffles' Landing Site along the Singapore River, which the Kingdom of Singapura was built upon.

== Bibliography ==
- Ahmad, A. Samad (1979), Sulalatus Salatin (Sejarah Melayu), Dewan Bahasa dan Pustaka, ISBN 983-62-5601-6, archived from the original on 12 October 2013
- Abdul Rahman, Haji Ismail; Abdullah Zakaria, Ghazali; Zulkanain, Abdul Rahman (2011), A New Date on the Establishment of Melaka Malay Sultanate Discovered (PDF), Institut Kajian Sejarah dan Patriotisme ( Institute of Historical Research and Patriotism ), archived from the original (PDF) on 1 October 2018
- Abshire, Jean E. (2011), The History of Singapore, Greenwood, ISBN 978-0-313-37742-6
- Aljunied, Syed Muhd Khairudin; Heng, Derek (2009), Reframing Singapore: Memory - Identity - Trans-Regionalism, Amsterdam University Press, ISBN 978-90-8964-094-9
- Commonwealth Secretariat (2004), Commonwealth Yearbook 2006, Commonwealth Secretariat, ISBN 978-0-9549629-4-4
- Dewan Bahasa dan Pustaka (2010), Search: Singa, archived from the original on 7 February 2016
- Heng, Derek (2005), "Continuities and Changes: Singapore as a Port-City over 700 Years", Biblioasia, 1, National Library Board, ISSN 0219-8126
- Heidhues, Mary Somers (2001), Southeast Asia: A Concise History, Hudson and Thames, ISBN 978-0-500-28303-5
- Keng, Cheah Boon; Ismail, Abdul Rahman Haji, eds. (1998), Sejarah Melayu The Malay Annals MS RAFFLES No. 18 Edisi Rumi Baru/New Romanised Edition, Academic Art & Printing Services Sdn. Bhd.
- Leyden, John (1821), Malay Annals (translated from the Malay language), Longman, Hurst, Rees, Orme and Brown
- Liow, Joseph Chinyong (2004), The Politics of Indonesia-Malaysia Relations: One Kin, Two Nations, Routledge, ISBN 978-0-415-34132-5
- Miksic, John N. (2013), Singapore and the Silk Road of the Sea, 1300–1800, NUS Press, ISBN 978-9971-69-574-3
- Miksic, John N.; Goh, Geok Yian (2017). Ancient Southeast Asia. London: Routledge.
- Nugroho, Irawan Djoko (2011), Majapahit Peradaban Maritim, Suluh Nuswantara Bakti, ISBN 978-602-9346-00-8
- O'Mara, Michael (1999), Facts About the World's Nation, H. W. Wilson, ISBN 978-0-8242-0955-1
- Ooi, Keat Gin (2004), Southeast Asia: a historical encyclopedia, from Angkor Wat to East Timor, ABC-CLIO, ISBN 1-57607-770-5
- Ooi, Keat Gin (2009), Historical Dictionary of Malaysia, Scarecrow Press, ISBN 978-0-8108-5955-5
- Rockhill, William Woodville (1915). "Notes on the Relations and Trade of China with the Eastern Archipelago and the Coast of the Indian Ocean During the Fourteenth Century, Part II - Introductory Note". T'oung Pao. 1: 61–159.
- Sabrizain, Palembang Prince or Singapore Renegade?, archived from the original on 6 June 2017
- Sinha, Prakash Chandra (2006), Encyclopedia of South East and East Asia, Anmol Publications Pvt Ltd, ISBN 978-81-261-2646-0
- Taylor, Nora A. (2000), Studies on Southeast Asia (Studies on Southeast Asian Art: Essays in Honor of Stanley J. O'Connor), vol. 29, Southeast Asia Program Publications, ISBN 978-0-87727-728-6
- Tsang, Susan; Perera, Audrey (2011), Singapore at Random, Didier Millet, ISBN 978-981-4260-37-4
- Turnbull, [C.M.] Mary (2009). A History of Modern Singapore, 1819-2005. NUS Press. ISBN 978-9971-69-430-2.
- Windstedt, Richard Olaf (1938), "The Malay Annals or Sejarah Melayu", Journal of the Malayan Branch of the Royal Asiatic Society, XVI, Singapore: Printers Limited: 1–226
