= Sri Wikrama Wira =

- Paduka

2nd Raja of Singapura
- Reign: 1347–1362
- Predecessor: Sang Nila Utama
- Successor: Sri Rana Wikrama
- Born: Early 14th century Singapura
- Died: 1362; Singapura
- Burial: Fort Canning Hill
- Spouse: Nila Panjadi
- Issue: Sri Rana Wikrama
- Father: Sang Nila Utama
- Mother: Wan Sri Bini

According to the Malay Annals, Paduka Sri Wikrama Wira or Sri Pikrama Wira ('Vikramavira') was the eldest son of Sang Nila Utama and the second Raja of Singapura. He was known as Raja Kecil Besar before his accession and married to an Indian princess named Nila Panjadi. His reign was from 1347 to 1362.

== Reign ==
His reign marks the first attempt by the Siamese to subjugate the island kingdom. As recorded by Wang Dayuan in 1349, a Siamese fleet consisted of 70 junks descended upon the island kingdom. The heavily fortified city managed to withstand the siege of the Siamese until the fleet fleeing with the arrival of Chinese ships; this incident was recorded by a Chinese merchant named Wang Dayuan in his own account, the Daoyi Zhilue.

At the same time, the increasingly powerful Javanese kingdom of Majapahit, began eyeing the growing influence of the tiny island kingdom. Under the leadership of its ambitious warlord, Gajah Mada, Majapahit started to embark on overseas expansions against all kingdoms of Nusantara including the remnants of the Srivijaya. In 1350, Hayam Wuruk ascended to the throne of Majapahit. The new king sent an envoy to Singapura demanding the submission of the tiny kingdom. Sri Wikrama Wira refused to do so and even sent a symbolic message threatening to shave the Majapahit king's head should he proceed to Singapura.

The furious Majapahit king ordered an invasion with a fleet of 180 main warships and innumerable small vessels. The fleet passed through the islands of Bintan, from where the news spread to Singapura. The defenders immediately assembled 400 warships to face the invasion. Both sides clashed on the coast of Singapura in a battle that took place over three days. The Javanese were largely inexperienced in naval warfare, and were completely overwhelmed and forced to flee.

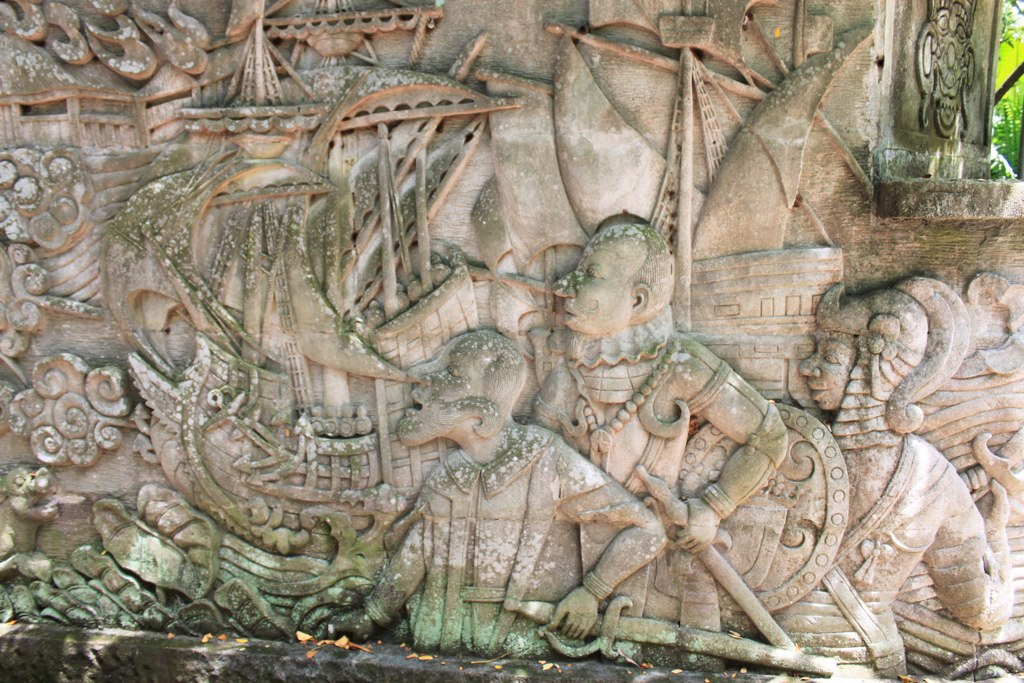
A depiction of armed Malay warriors in a mural on Fort Canning Park, alluding to the conflicts during Sri Wikrama Wira's reign.

Sri Wikrama Wira House of Sang Sapurba
Regnal titles
Preceded by Sang Nila Utama	Raja of Singapura; 1347–1362	Succeeded by Sri Rana Wikrama
