= Wang Dayuan =

Chinese explorer (born 1311)

Wang Dayuan (Chinese: 汪大淵; pinyin: Wāng Dàyuān, fl. 1311–1350), courtesy name Huanzhang (Chinese: 煥章; pinyin: Huànzhāng), was a Chinese traveller from Jiangxi in the 14th century. He is known for his two major ship voyages.

Wang Dayuan was born around 1311 at Hongzhou (present-day Nanchang). During 1328–1333, he sailed along the South China Sea and visited many places in Southeast Asia. He reached as far as South Asia and landed in modern-day Bangladesh, Sri Lanka, and India. In 1334–1339 he visited North Africa and East Africa.

Around 1330, Wang visited the island of Singapore, where he wrote about a small settlement called Danmaxi (Chinese: 淡马锡; pinyin: Dànmǎxī, Malay: Temasek) that had both Malay and Chinese residents, and already had an established Chinatown. His 1349 account of his travel, Dao Yi Zhi Lue (simplified Chinese: 岛夷志略; traditional Chinese: 島夷誌略; pinyin: Dǎo Yí Zhì Lüè; A Brief Account of Island Barbarians), is one of the few records documenting the early history of Singapore.

== Taiwan ==
=== Liuqiu ===
In 1349, Wang Dayuan provided the first written account of a visit to Taiwan. He described it as the first overseas kingdom or country「海外諸國，蓋由此始」“Overseas countries start from here”. He found no Chinese settlers there but many on Penghu.

Wang called different regions of Taiwan Liuqiu and Pisheye. According to Wang, Liuqiu was a vast land of huge trees and mountains named Cuilu, Zhongman, Futou, and Dazhi. A mountain could be seen from Penghu. He climbed the mountain and could see the coasts. Wang described a rich land with fertile fields that was hotter than Penghu. Its people had different customs from Penghu. They did not have boats and oars but only rafts. The men and women bound their hair and wore colored garments. They obtained salt from boiled sea water and liquor from fermented sugarcane juice. There were barbarian lords and chiefs that were respected by the people and they had a bone-and-flesh relationship between father and son. They practiced cannibalism against their enemies. The land's products included gold, beans, millet, sulphur, beeswax, deer hide, leopards, and moose. They accepted pearls, agates, gold, beads, dishware, and pottery as items of trade.

=== Pisheye ===
According to Wang, Pisheye was located to the east. It had extensive mountains and plains but the people did not engage in much agriculture or produce any products. The weather was hotter than Liuqiu. Its people wore their hair in tufts, tattooed their bodies with black juice, and wrapped red silk and yellow cloth around their heads. Pisheye had no chief. Its people hid in wild mountains and solitary valleys. They practiced raiding and plundering by boat. Kidnapping and slave trading were common. The historian Efren B. Isorena, through analysis of historical accounts and wind currents in the Pacific side of East and Southeast Asia, concluded that the Pisheye of Taiwan and the Bisaya of the Visayas islands in the Philippines, were closely related people as Visayans were recorded to have travelled to Taiwan from the Philippines via the northward windcurrents before they raided China and returned south after the southwards monsoon during summer.

== Bibliography ==
- Rubinstein, Murray A. (1999), Taiwan: A New History, East Gate Books
- Thompson, Lawrence G. (1964). "The earliest eyewitness accounts of the Formosan aborigines". Monumenta Serica. 23: 163–204. doi:10.1080/02549948.1964.11731044. JSTOR 40726116.
- Wong, Young-tsu (2017), China's Conquest of Taiwan in the Seventeenth Century: Victory at Full Moon, Springer
