= Daoyi Zhilüe =

Book by Wang Dayuan

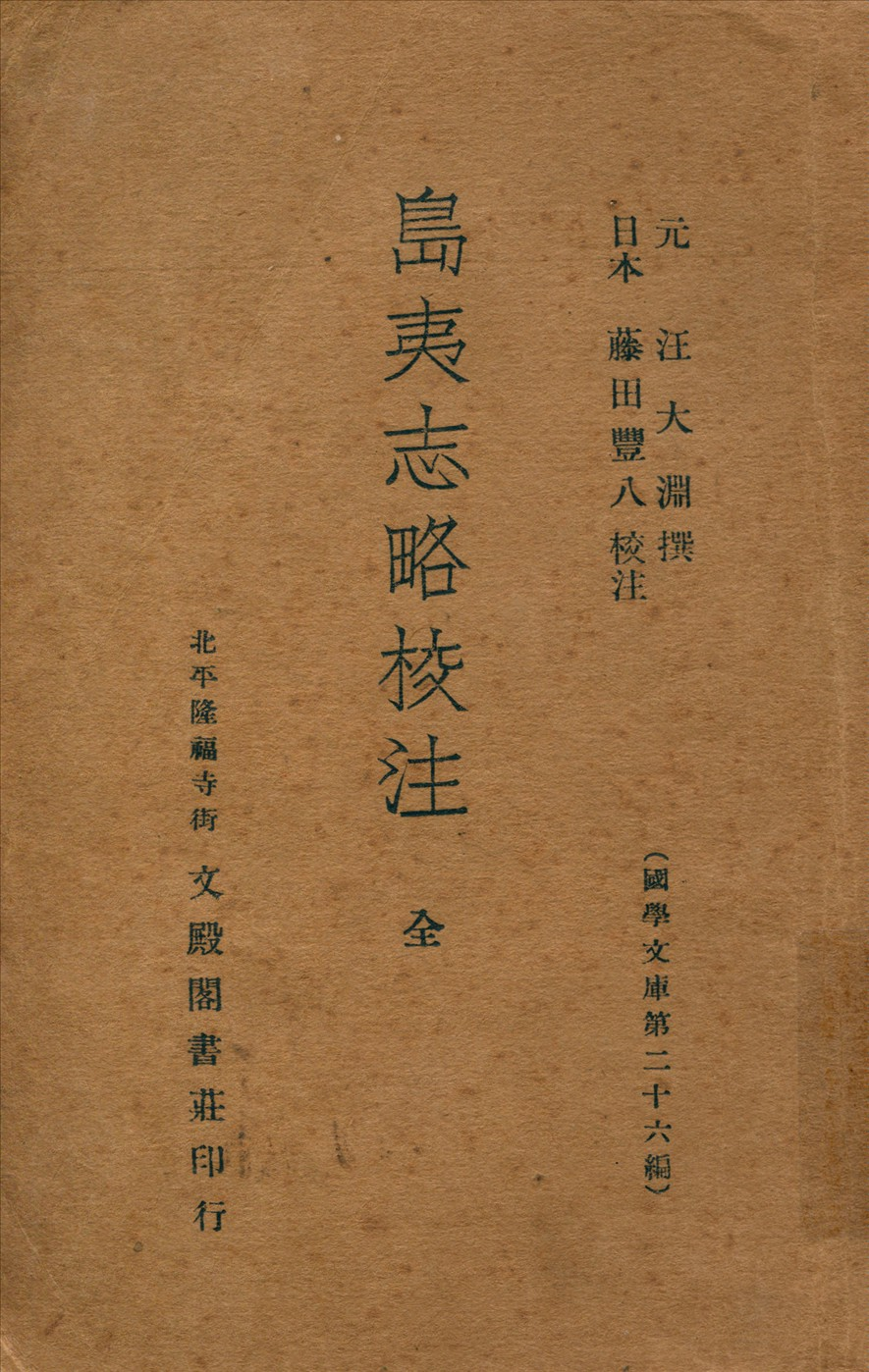

Daoyi Zhilüe (simplified Chinese: 岛夷志略; traditional Chinese: 島夷誌略; pinyin: Dǎo Yí Zhì Lüè; Wade–Giles: Tao i chih lio) or Daoyi Zhi (simplified Chinese: 岛夷志; traditional Chinese: 島夷誌; pinyin: Dǎo Yí Zhì; Wade–Giles: Tao i chih) which may be translated as A Brief Account of Island Barbarians or other similar titles, is a book written c. 1339 (completed c. 1349) by Yuan dynasty Chinese traveller Wang Dayuan recounting his travels to over a hundred places in South Asia, Southeast Asia, and Africa. The book was written in present-day Sri Lanka. It described the weather, products, people, and customs of the places that Wang Dayuan visited.

The timeline for Wang Dayuan's life and travels is:

- 1311 - born
- 1330 - sailed for the first time from Quanzhou
- 1334 - returned to Yuan dynasty
- 1337 - sailed for the second time from Quanzhou
- 1339 - returned to Yuan dynasty

The content of the book (known as Dao Yi Zhu) was originally an appendix in a local gazetteer Qing Yuan Xu Zhi (清源续志, A Continuation of the History and Topography of Quanzhou) composed by Wu Jian in 1349. According to the Yuan poet Zhang Zhu, Daoyi Zhilüe was re-published in 1350 as an individual travel account.

Andaya and Andaya write that Dao Yi Zhi Lue provides more information on areas east of the Malay Peninsula than any other Yuan dynasty source. According to the postscript Wang Dayuan visited all the places described. However, Park notes that 90% of the text is devoted to Southeast Asia and that Wang does not give details of his route and itinerary to West Asia. However, Deng states that Wang Dayuan's account is consistent with later Ming dynasty accounts of Zheng He's travels. There is currently no full English translation of the book but the Chinese version is available online. Partial translations however are available.

== See also ==
- Zhu fan zhi
- Chinese exploration

== Bibliography ==
- Rockhill, William Woodville (1914). "Notes on the Relations and Trade of China with the Eastern Archipelago and the Coast of the Indian Ocean During the Fourteenth Century, Part I - I." T'oung Pao. 1: 419–447.
- Rockhill, William Woodville (1915). "Notes on the Relations and Trade of China with the Eastern Archipelago and the Coast of the Indian Ocean During the Fourteenth Century, Part II - Introductory Note". T'oung Pao. 1: 61–159.
- Rockhill, William Woodville (1915). "Notes on the Relations and Trade of China with the Eastern Archipelago and the Coast of the Indian Ocean During the Fourteenth Century, Part II - II. Java and the Eastern Archipelago". T'oung Pao. 1: 236–271.
- Rockhill, William Woodville (1915). "Notes on the Relations and Trade of China with the Eastern Archipelago and the Coast of the Indian Ocean During the Fourteenth Century, Part II - III. Ceylon and Maldive Islands". T'oung Pao. 1: 374–392.
- Rockhill, William Woodville (1915). "Notes on the relations and trade of China with the eastern archipelago and the coast of the Indian Ocean during the fourteenth century, Part II - IV. Coasts of India". T'oung Pao. 1: 435–467.
- 1330 - Singapore's Early Settlements & Trade - a short documentary about how Singapore was depicted in Wang Dayuan's Daoyi Zhilue, produced for the Singapore Bicentennial in 2019.
