= Irreligion in Singapore =

Religion in Singapore (residents only, census 2025)
Religion	Percent
Buddhism	30.9%
None	23.9%
Christianity	17.1%
Islam	15.0%
Taoism	7.3%
Hinduism	5.4%
Sikhism or others	0.4%

As of the last census in 2025, 24% of residents (Note: In Singapore, the term "resident" refers to both citizens and permanent residents (PRs).) in Singapore have no religious affiliation. The rate of irreligion varies among the different ethnic groups of Singapore; officially, about 30% of ethnic Chinese have no religion, compared to 3.2% of Indians and just 0.4% of Malays. Age also plays a factor: around 27% of people aged 15 to 24 indicated they had no religious connection, compared to 19% of residents aged 55 and over. While Singapore is a secular state, the true figures of irreligion may not be properly ascertained, as leaving certain religions can result in ostracism by one's family or community.

Singapore's non-religious tend to be atheists, agnostics, humanists, theists, deists or skeptics. Some locals affiliate with no religion, but will still continue practicing traditional rituals like ancestral worship, which they do not necessarily regard as religious in essence. The number of non-religious people in Singapore has risen. Census reports show that those who said they have no religion rose from 13% in 1980 to 24% in 2025. In recent years, social gatherings of non-religious people have become more popular in Singapore.

== Humanist Society of Singapore ==
In 2008, the Singapore Humanism Meetup was formed as a social network of secular humanists, atheists and agnostics. In October 2010, the Humanist Society (Singapore) became the first humanist group to be gazetted as a society. Many pioneer members of the society met at gatherings organised by the Singapore Humanism Meetup.

== Affiliation ==
Non-religious groups in Singapore are also linked to other non-religious networks in Southeast Asia. The Singapore Humanism Meetup, Singaporean Atheists and Humanist Society (Singapore) are listed on the Southeast Asian Atheists website.

== See also ==
- Religion in Singapore
- Article 15 of the Constitution of Singapore
- Freedom of religion in Singapore
- Humanism
