= Sri Rana Wikrama =

- Paduka

3rd Raja of Singapura
- Reign: 1362 - 1375
- Predecessor: Sri Wikrama Wira
- Successor: Sri Maharaja
- Born: Early 14th century Singapura
- Died: 1375; Singapura
- Spouse: Malay princess
- Issue: Sri Maharaja
- Father: Sri Wikrama Wira
- Mother: Nila Panjadi

Paduka Sri Rana Wikrama ('Ranavikrama') was the eldest son of Sri Wikrama Wira with his wife Nila Panjadi, and the third Raja of Singapura.

== Biography ==
He was known as Raja Muda his accession and married to a daughter of Bendahara Tun Perpatih Muka Berjajar. His reign was from 1362 to 1375.

Despite the failure in the previous campaign against Singapura under the rule of his father, the Javanese chronicle Nagarakretagama list Singapura as a subject of Majapahit in 1365. During his reign, Rana Wira Kerma established a diplomatic ties with a Sumatran Muslim kingdom, Peureulak. It was during this time also, a legendary man with an unusual strength, Badang, was said to have demonstrated his feat of strength in Rana Wikrama's court.

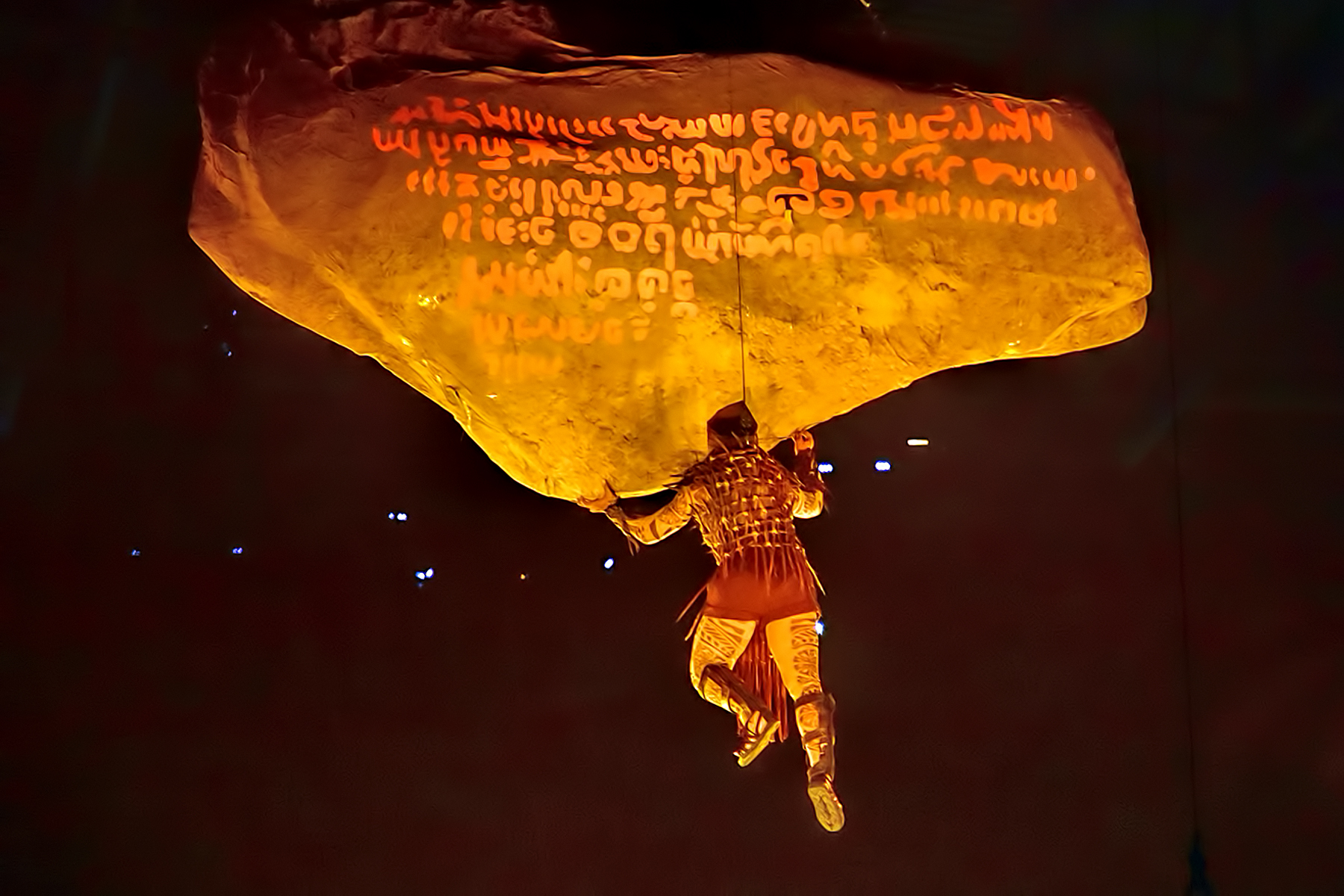
A depiction of the legendary strongman Badang lifting the Singapore Stone at National Day Parade 2016.

Sri Rana Wikrama House of Sang Sapurba
Regnal titles
Preceded by Sri Wikrama Wira	Raja of Singapura; 1362–1375	Succeeded by Sri Maharaja
