= Badang =

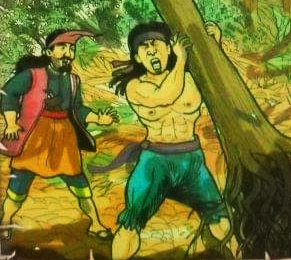

In-universe information
- Gender: Male
- Title: Panglima Badang
- Origin: Batu Pahat, Sultanate of Johore
- Nationality: Malay
- Died: Buru, Karimun, Riau islands, Sultanate of Johore
- Abilities: Superhuman strength Above average durability, stamina and speed Hand-to-hand combat expert

Badang is a legendary Southeast Asian strongman from the Malay world, said to have originated from Batu Pahat, in present-day Johore. According to traditional Malay folklore, Badang was a common laborer who gained superhuman strength after encountering a mystical being. He later rose to fame in the court of Sri Rana Wikrama, a ruler of the Kingdom of Singapura, where he became renowned for feats of strength and acts of loyalty.

Badang is associated with various regional legends and historical artefacts, most notably the Singapore Stone, although there is no historical evidence linking him to it.

== Sources ==
The written record of the legend of Si Badang is found in the Malay Annals, an important collection of oral folklore from the Malay World. Variations of the legend of Badang exist due to the oral nature of its transmission, and its popular use in children's literature.

== Mythology ==
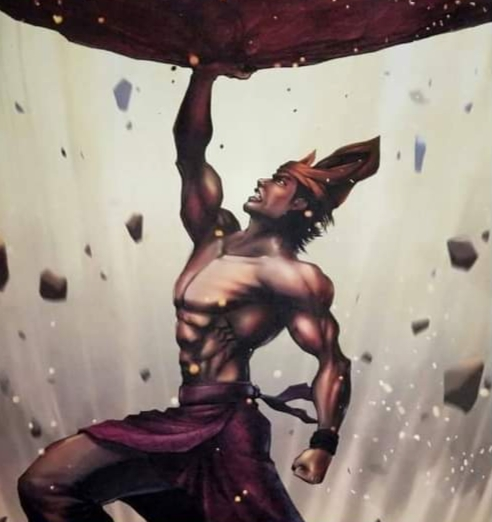
Badang lifted the stone

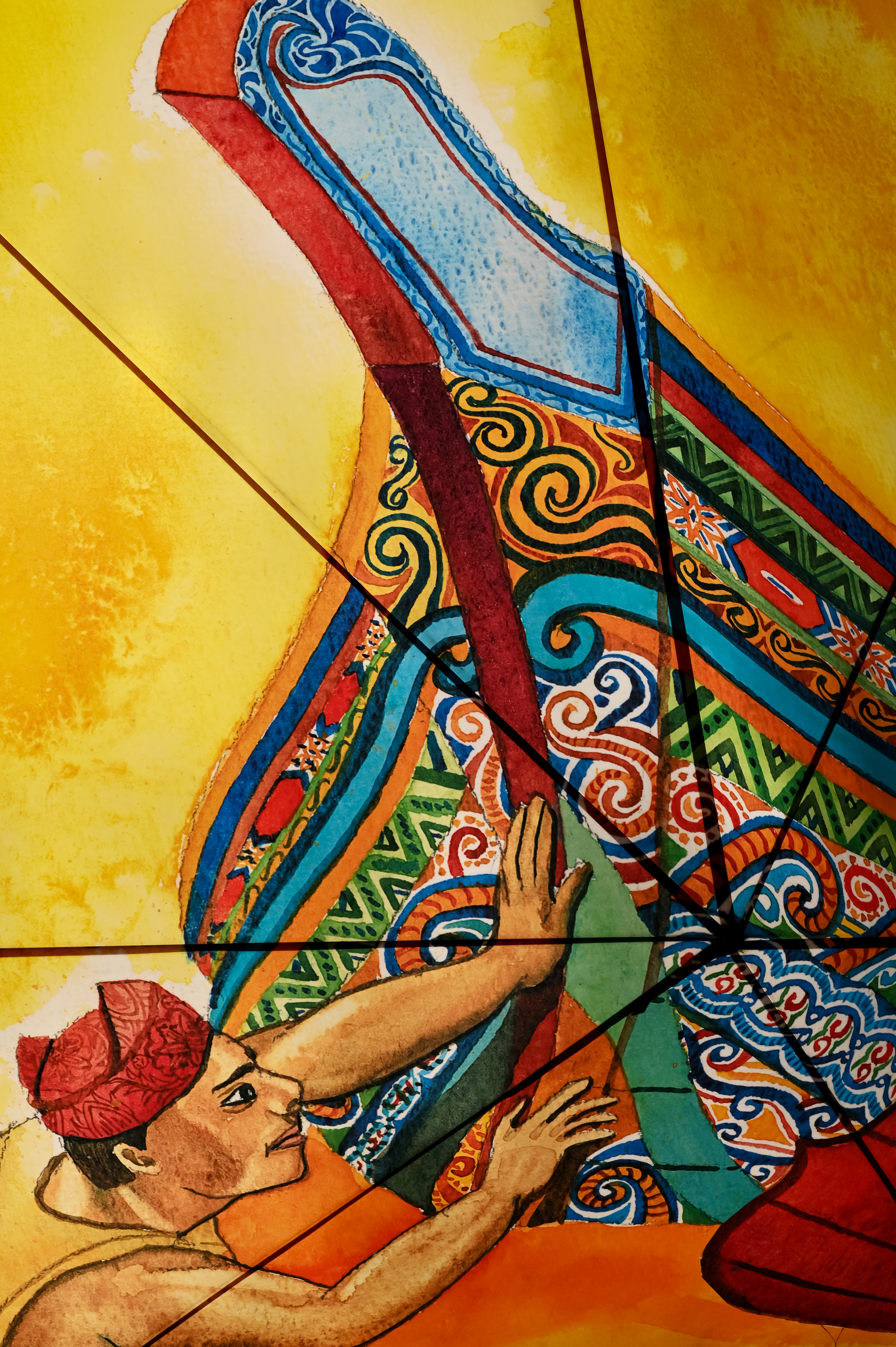
Artwork featuring Badang pushing the Raja's boat at Singapore Night Festival 2023.

Badang was a Malay boy from Batu Pahat, in the northern part of the Sultanate of Johor (corresponds to the modern day state of Johor, Malaysia). He was the only son of two poor farmers who worked hard until the day they died. As a young man, Badang worked as a coolie for the rich farmer Orang Kaya Nira Sura in a place called Salung or Saluang in Aceh, Sumatra (modern-day Indonesia). Badang was small-statured and the weakest of his group. Their job was to clear through the undergrowth to make way for new fields. As slaves, they didn't get paid and received only a few handfuls of rice each day. This was hardly enough to satisfy the hunger of such arduous work, so Badang relied on catching fish for extra sustenance. He set his fish-traps along the stream every evening and gathered the net the following morning.

One day, Badang found that the fish-traps he laid in a river contained bones and scales. He prepared the fish-traps again, but the same incident went on for several days. Badang armed himself with a rattan stick, or a parang in some versions, and hid in the bushes of the jungle. The creature taking his fish was a demon, Jembalang air/hantu air or water spirit capable of taking the form of any flora and fauna which lives around bodies of water, described as having eyes red as fire, long matted hair, and a long beard covering its chest or reaching its waist.

Badang seized the demon and tied its hair to a rock. The demon begged for mercy and promised to grant Badang any wish if he spared his life. Badang wished for strength so that he would not tire working. The demon said that if Badang wanted great strength, he would have to swallow whatever he coughs up. The demon then vomited and Badang ate its vomit. In some sanitised versions the demon coughed out two red gems called geliga for Badang to swallow.

Badang became immensely strong. One day, Nira Sura wanted to expand his farm land in Baruah. But Nira Sura found out that Badang was resting in mid day and he suspected that Badang didn't do his work. Nira sura found that a large section of the forest was cleared so quickly and Badang explained everything that had transpired. The landowner was so grateful for the servant's loyalty that he freed Badang from slavery on the condition that he never boasts of his strength and uses it to help others. When news of Badang's feat reached the Kingdom of Singapura, the Raja Sri Rana Wicrama invited Badang to the kingdom, to appoint him a Raden (a princely title).

One day, the Raja had a large boat constructed and instructed fifty men to push it into the water, but they were unable to do so. Badang continually offered to help but the men refused, saying that no one so small would make any difference. The Raja eventually sent 300 men to help push the vessel but it was to no avail. The Raja then sent 3000 men to push the boat, but all of them failed. The Raja then gave Badang the chance to push the boat by himself, and Badang was able to do so. For his feat, the Raja Sri Rana Wicrama appointed Badang a hulubalang, or Champion, of his court.

Badang was frequently asked to do favours. He often helped farmers and villagers carry their goods in place of a horse and carriage. The king once asked him to gather the tasty kuras leaves from Kuala Sayong in Sumatra, so Badang set off in a boat by himself. When he climbed the kuras tree, its branch broke and Badang fell a long way, his head hitting a rock. To his surprise, Badang was completely unharmed and the rock was split in two. Today, that rock is called the Split Stone (Batu Belah).

Over time, Badang had become known in other nearby countries as well. The king of Kalinga on the Indian subcontinent wanted to test Badang's strength against his own champion, Nadi Bijaya (or Wadi Bijaya) who was reputed to be stronger than all the other strongmen of his kingdom. The Indian warrior sailed to the Malay Archipelago and greeted the local king with the friendly challenge. Seri Rana Wikrama took great pleasure in tests of skill and agreed. As decreed by the Indian king, the loser would owe the victor seven ships of cargo. Badang competed against Nadi Bijaya in several contests of strength and wrestling but the result was always tied. Finally, Nadi Bijaya suggested that whoever can lift the large rock in front of the palace shall be declared the winner. He then lifted the rock to his knees and immediately dropped it. When it was Badang's turn, he lifted the rock above his head and threw it, where it landed at the mouth of the Singapore River. Nadi Bijaya acceded to the agreement and gave Badang the seven ships of cargo before returning to Kalinga.

Badang spent many years in the Kingdom of Singapura defeating challengers from other countries, including the champion of Java. When Badang eventually died, the king of Kalinga sent for two stone pillars to be placed at his grave.

== Related locations ==
Badang's grave is told to be located in Buru Island, part of the Riau Archipelago administered by modern-day Indonesia. In nearby Great Karimun, there is a sloping cliff where its stone is engraved describing indentations said to be Buddha's footsteps but is also associated with Badang; a Taoist shrine (keramat) has since been erected around it.

== Relation to the Singapore Stone ==
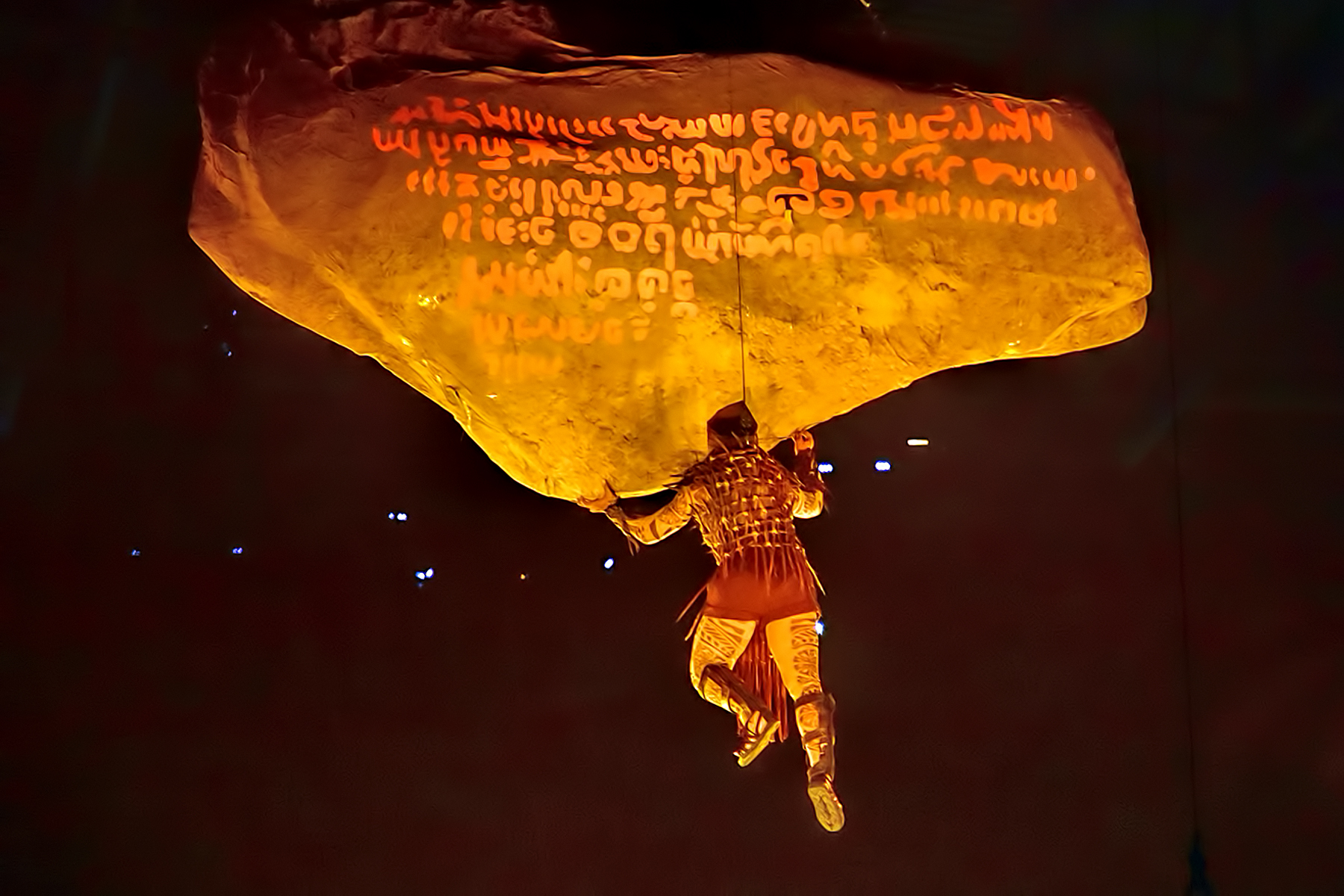
A depiction of Badang lifting the Singapore Stone at National Day Parade 2016.

The Singapore Stone is a fragment of a large slab of rock that sat at the mouth of the Singapore River. It is currently on display at the National Museum of Singapore. The slab was blown up in 1843 and only fragments remain. One folktale for the slab's origin is that it was lifted and thrown by Badang, during one of his feats of strength.

== In popular culture ==
- Badang is a fighter hero in the video game Mobile Legends: Bang Bang, based on the eponymous character.

== See also ==
- Si Pitung, legendary hero of Betawi people, Indonesia
