= Sri Maharaja =

- Paduka

4th Raja of Singapura
- Reign: 1375-1389
- Predecessor: Sri Rana Wikrama
- Successor: Iskandar Shah
- Born: Mid 14th century Singapura
- Died: 1389; Singapura
- Issue: Iskandar Shah
- Father: Sri Rana Wikrama
- Mother: Malay princess

Paduka Sri Maharaja was the eldest son of Sri Rana Wikrama and the fourth Raja of Singapura. He was known as Damia Raja before his accession.

== Reign ==
According to Malay Annals, the reign of Sri Maharaja was marked with the event of swordfish ravaging the coast of Singapura. A young boy, Hang Nadim, thought of an ingenious solution to fend off the swordfish. The king was initially grateful, but felt increasingly threatened by the boy's intelligence, and ordered to have the boy executed; Hang Nadim's blood is said to have permanently stained the ground red, giving rise to the term "Bukit Merah" ("red hill"). In 1389, Sri Maharaja was succeeded by his son, Iskandar Shah, who is commonly identified with Parameswara, the founder of the Melaka Sultanate.

Sri Maharaja House of Sang Sapurba
Regnal titles
Preceded by Sri Rana Wikrama	Raja of Singapura; 1375–1389	Succeeded by Iskandar Shah
