= Humanist Society (Singapore) =

- Abbreviation: HSS
- Formation: October 6, 2010; 15 years ago
- Founded at: Singapore
- Type: Non-Profit
- Purpose: Promote secular humanism
- Location: Singapore
- Affiliations: Humanists International
- Website: http://www.humanist.org.sg/

Humanist Society (Singapore) is registered on 6 October, 2010 as a society in Singapore for humanists, freethinkers, atheists, agnostics and other like-minded people. The non-religious make up 20% of the Singapore population as of last available Census in 2020.

== Organization ==
The society's objective is to work to raise awareness on how a secular and non-religious segment of Singapore's population has contributed to the progress of Singapore as a nation and a member of the global community, and that a rational, non-dogmatic approach to social issues ought not be taken for granted.

Aside from their work towards maintaining a secular space in society, the Society hold events relating to Humanism, critical thinking and provide a social space for like-minded people to hold discussions. Events include talks by prominent Humanists, professionals in the sciences, forums and social get-togethers.

== History ==
In 2008, the Singapore Humanism Meetup was formed as a social network of secular humanists, atheists and agnostics. They had been meeting regularly to discuss current social issues. The network, which uses a website to organize social gatherings, has over 500 members registered online, meeting in various locations over town to hold workshops, talks and book clubs. In 2009, the network also held the first Darwin Day in Singapore to celebrate the 200th birthday of Charles Darwin.

In October 2010, the Humanist Society of Singapore became the first humanist group to be gazetted as a society. Many pioneer members of the society met at gatherings organised by the Singapore Humanism Meetup.

== See also ==
- Religion in Singapore
- Article 15 of the Constitution of Singapore
- Freedom of religion in Singapore
- Humanism
