= Economy of Singapore =

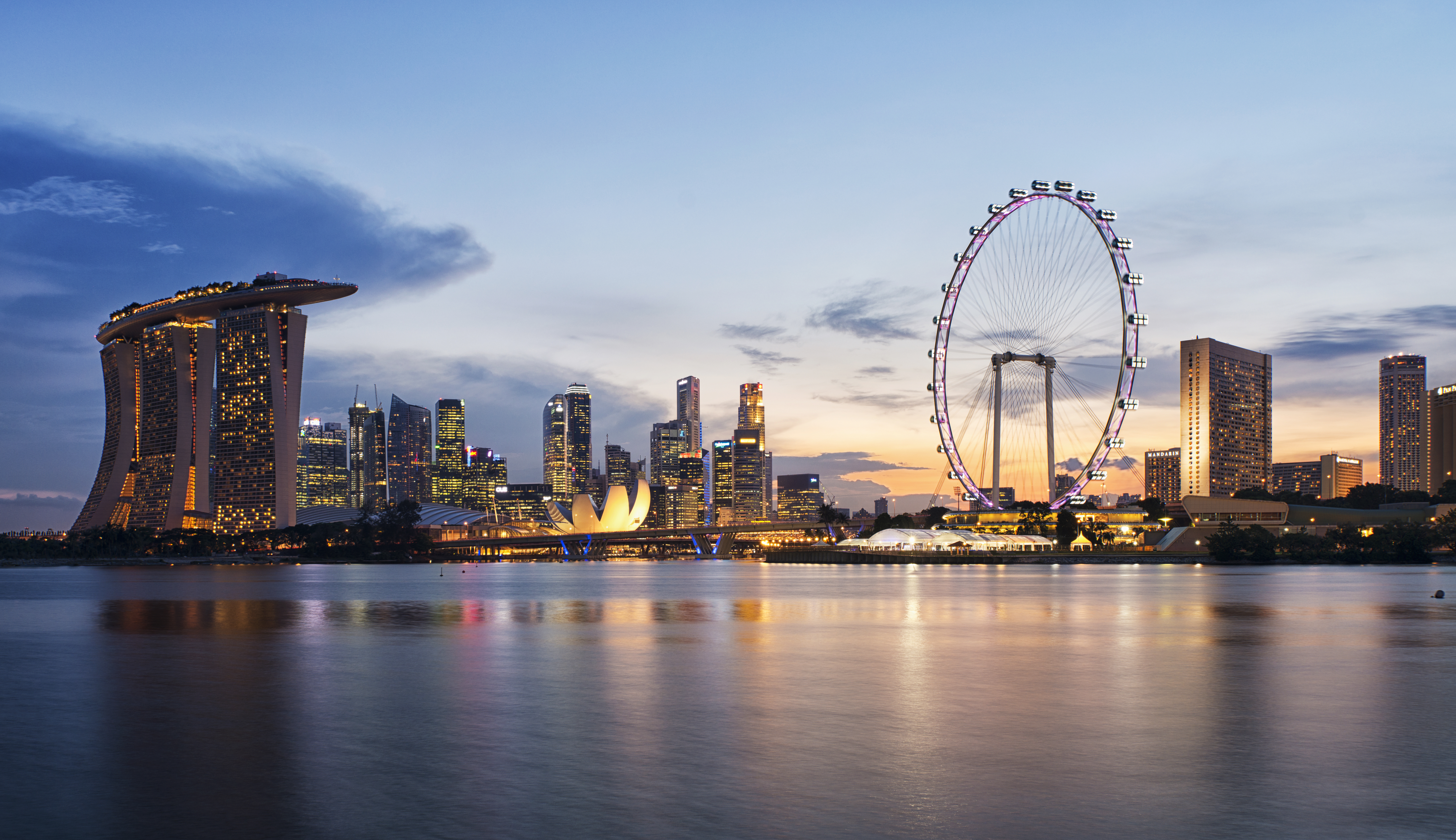
- Skyline of Singapore's Downtown Core
- Currency: Singapore dollar (SGD/S$)
- Fiscal year: 1 April – 31 March
- Trade organisations: WTO, APEC, CPTPP, IOR-ARC, RCEP, ASEAN and others
- Country group: Advanced economy; High-income economy

Statistics
- Population: 6,211,400 (2026)
- GDP: ▲$659.57 billion (nominal; 2026); ▲$1.07 trillion (PPP; 2026)
- GDP rank: 26th (nominal; 2026); 34th (PPP; 2026)
- GDP growth: ▲4.4% (2024); ▲2.0% (2025); ▲1.9% (2026f); ▲2.3% (2027f)
- GDP per capita: ▲$107,760 (nominal; 2026); ▲$173,710 (PPP; 2026)
- GDP per capita rank: 4th (nominal; 2026); 1st (PPP; 2026)
- GDP by sector: Agriculture: 0.5%; Industry: 24.8%; Services: 75.2%; (2017 est.)
- Inflation (CPI): 0.9% (Apr 2025)
- Population below national poverty line: N/A
- Gini coefficient: ▼42.6 medium (2025) (Note: Before taxes and social transfers.)
- Human Development Index: ▲0.946 very high (2023) (13th); ▲0.823 very high IHDI (32nd) (2023)
- Corruption Perceptions Index: 84 out of 100 points (2024, 3rd)
- Labour force: ▲3,843,513 (2021); ▲65.1% employment rate (2018)
- Labour force by occupation: Agriculture: 0.7%; Industry: 25.6%; Services: 73.7%; (2017 est.); excludes non-residents
- Unemployment: ▼1.8% (March 2024 est.)
- Youth unemployment: ▲6.8% (2025)
- Average gross salary: S$8,480 / US$6,678 monthly
- Average net salary: S$7,310 / US$5,756 monthly (2024)
- Main industries: Electronics; Financial services; Information and communications technology; Civil engineering; Oil drilling and exploration; Petroleum refining; Chemical products; Cosmetic products; Biomedical products; Scientific instruments; Medical tourism; Telecommunications equipment; Rubber; Food and beverages products; Marine engineering and shipbuilding; Security services; Life sciences; Re-exportation; Waste management and recycling; Arts & entertainment; Fashion; Design; Small-scale agriculture and aquaculture

External
- Exports: ▲US$942 billion (2022)
- Export goods: Foodstuff; Cosmetics; Machinery and equipment; Electronics and telecommunications; Pharmaceuticals and other chemicals; Refined petroleum products; Chemical products
- Main export partners: ASEAN 28.7%; Malaysia 10.7%; Indonesia 6.67%; Vietnam 5.16%; China (including SAR) 28.2%; Hong Kong 15.5%; China 12.6%; United States 8.51%; EU 6.89%; South Korea 3.33%; Australia 3.25%; Taiwan 3.06% (2024)
- Imports: ▲US$870 billion (2022)
- Import goods: Machinery and equipment; Mineral fuels; Chemicals; Foodstuffs; Consumer goods
- Main import partners: ASEAN 21.7%; Malaysia 12.2%; Indonesia 3.47%; Thailand 3.11%; China (including SAR) 14.5%; China 13.5%; Hong Kong 1%; Taiwan 12.5%; United States 9.94%; EU 8.57%; South Korea 5.45%; Japan 4.72% (2024)
- FDI stock: ▲$1.285 trillion (31 December 2017 est.); ▲ Abroad: $841.4 billion (31 December 2017 est.)
- Current account: ▲$60.99 billion (2017 est.)
- Gross external debt: ▲$168.3 billion (31 December 2017 est.) (Note: Singapore's public debt consists largely of Singapore Government Securities (SGS) issued to assist the Central Provident Fund (CPF), which administers Singapore's defined contribution pension fund; special issues of SGS are held by the CPF, and are non-tradable; the government has not borrowed to finance deficit expenditures since the 1980s; Singapore has no external public debt.)
- Net international investment position: S$1.410 trillion (Q1 2026)

Public finance
- Government debt: 167.8% of GDP (2022 est.)
- Foreign reserves: ▲US$426.247 billion (June 2026)
- Revenue: S$130.86 billion (2025)
- Spending: S$124.46 billion (2025)
- Economic aid: N/A
- Credit rating: Standard & Poor's: AAA (Domestic); AAA (Foreign); AAA (T&C Assessment); Outlook: Stable; Moody's: Aaa; Outlook: Stable; Fitch: AAA; Outlook: Stable
- All values, unless otherwise stated, are in US dollars.

The economy of Singapore is a highly developed mixed market economy with dirigiste characteristics. Singapore's economy has been consistently ranked as the most open, competitive and pro-business in the world. It is also perceived as the 3rd least corrupt in the world. Singapore has low tax-rates and the highest per-capita GDP in the world in terms of purchasing power parity (PPP). The Asia-Pacific Economic Cooperation (APEC) is headquartered in Singapore.

Alongside the business-friendly reputation for global and local privately held companies and public companies, various national state-owned enterprises play a role in Singapore's economy. The sovereign wealth fund Temasek Holdings holds majority stakes in several of the nation's largest bellwether companies, such as Singapore Airlines, Singtel, ST Engineering and Mediacorp. With regard to foreign direct investment (FDI), the Singaporean economy is a major FDI outflow-financier in the world. In addition, throughout its history, Singapore has benefited from the large inward flows of FDI from global investors, financial institutions and multinational corporations (MNCs) due to its attractive investment climate along with a stable political environment throughout its modern years.

== Overview ==
Singapore relies on an extended concept of intermediary trade to entrepôt trade, by purchasing raw goods and refining them for re-export in order to sustain its high levels of export-oriented industrialization, such as in the wafer-fabrication industry and in oil refining. Singapore has a strategic port which makes it more competitive than many of its neighbours in carrying out such entrepôt activities. Singapore's trade-to-GDP ratio is among the highest in the world, as of 2020 the ratio was 320%. The Port of Singapore is the sixth-busiest in the world by cargo tonnage and is the busiest transshipment port in the world.

Singapore is also a regional, continental, and global hub for the management and operations of various MNCs because of its location in proximity of other Asia-Pacific markets, along with its connectivity and infrastructure (including airline hubs, maritime ports, Gigabit fiber-optic communications, road transport and public transport) and its immigration policies in encouraging global talent. In addition, Singapore is an international destination for various types of tourism (Business tourism, MICE (Meetings, Incentives, Conferences, Exhibitions) tourism, Medical tourism, Urban tourism).

Singapore's economy is often referred to as a "miracle" due to its rapid transformation from a developing country to a developed, high-income economy in a relatively short period of time. This transformation took place in the second half of the 20th century under the leadership of Prime Minister Lee Kuan Yew and his government. One of the key factors contributing to Singapore's economic miracle was its strategic location, which made it an ideal hub for international trade and commerce.

The country's main exports include electronics, chemicals and services. Singapore is the regional hub for wealth management. Water is scarce in Singapore and a sizeable percentage of water is imported from Malaysia.

Small and medium-sized enterprises (SMEs) are the backbone of Singapore's economic landscape. In 2022 SMEs contributed 48% (S$284 bil) of Singapore's total enterprise nominal value-added and employed 71% of Singapore's total workforce of 3.63 million.

Singapore has limited arable land, meaning that Singapore is heavily reliant on agrotechnology parks (particularly vertical hydroponic farms) for agricultural production. As a result, Singapore imports 90% of its food supply and has a wide variety of supplier countries in order to achieve its food security; Singapore is ranked as among the most food secure in the world.

Apart from its strategic location at the cross-roads of trade between the East and the West, Singapore has little to no natural resources, hence human resources is a pivotal issue for the health of the Singaporean economy; the services and manufacturing sectors of the economy are heavily reliant on a highly-educated and highly-skilled 'Professional, Managerial, Executive and Technical' (PMET) workforce composed of residents and expatriates. The economy of Singapore ranked 2nd overall in the Scientific American Biotechnology ranking in 2014, with the featuring of Biopolis.

To preserve its international standing and to further its economic prosperity in the 21st century, Singapore has taken measures to promote innovation, to encourage entrepreneurship and to retrain its workforce. The Ministry of Manpower (MoM) has the prime responsibility for setting, adjusting, and enforcing immigration rules for foreign workers, in order to achieve the dual mandate of maximum employment of the local resident population and maximum economic growth for the nation. Approximately 29% of the total population within Singapore are non-resident foreigners, including 255,800 foreign domestic workers (FDWs) who operate in Singapore.

== Economic statistics ==
The following table shows the main economic indicators in 1980–2021 (with IMF staff estimates in 2022–2027). Inflation below 5% is in green.

Table of economic data from 1980 to 2021
Year	GDP (in Bil. US$PPP)	GDP per capita (in US$ PPP)	GDP (in Bil. US$nominal)	GDP per capita (in US$ nominal)	GDP growth (real)	Inflation rate (in Percent)	Unemployment (in Percent)	Government debt (in % of GDP)
1980	22.9	9,479.4	12.1	5,005.0	▲10.1%	▲8.5%	5.8%	n/a
1981	▲27.8	▲10,958.8	▲14.4	▲5,672.1	▲10.8%	▲8.2%	▲5.9%	n/a
1982	▲31.6	▲11,927.3	▲15.9	▲6,000.0	▲7.1%	▲3.9%	▲6.3%	n/a
1983	▲35.6	▲13,281.0	▲18.0	▲6,717.8	▲8.6%	▲1.0%	▼5.6%	n/a
1984	▲40.1	▲14,689.9	▲19.6	▲7,160.3	▲8.8%	▲2.6%	▲6.1%	n/a
1985	▲41.1	▲15,039.4	▼18.6	▼6,788.4	▼-0.6%	▲0.5%	▼4.6%	n/a
1986	▲42.5	▲15,563.0	▲18.8	▲6,870.8	▲1.3%	▲-1.4%	▼2.0%	n/a
1987	▲48.3	▲17,406.2	▲21.6	▲7,794.7	▲10.8%	▲0.5%	▲3.9%	n/a
1988	▲55.6	▲19,547.3	▲26.6	▲9,329.0	▲11.3%	▲1.5%	▼2.6%	n/a
1989	▲63.7	▲21,730.1	▲31.4	▲10,725.7	▲10.2%	▲2.3%	▼1.8%	n/a
1990	▲72.6	▲23,812.9	▲38.9	▲12,763.3	▲9.8%	▲3.5%	1.8%	73.5%
1991	▲80.0	▲25,528.0	▲45.5	▲14,502.0	▲6.7%	▲3.4%	1.8%	▲76.4%
1992	▲87.3	▲27,019.3	▲52.1	▲16,136.2	▲6.6%	▲2.2%	1.8%	▲79.0%
1993	▲99.6	▲30,059.3	▲60.6	▲18,290.1	▲11.5%	▲2.3%	▼1.7%	▼71.2%
1994	▲113.0	▲33,054.6	▲73.7	▲21,552.4	▲11.1%	▲3.1%	1.7%	▼70.7%
1995	▲123.7	▲35,087.0	▲87.8	▲24,914.9	▲7.2%	▲1.7%	▲1.8%	▼69.8%
1996	▲135.3	▲36,869.6	▲96.3	▲26,232.9	▲7.5%	▲1.4%	▼1.7%	▲71.3%
1997	▲149.1	▲39,283.1	▲100.1	▲26,375.9	▲8.3%	▲2.0%	▼1.4%	▼70.8%
1998	▼147.5	▼37,557.0	▼85.7	▼21,829.3	▼-2.2%	▲-0.3%	▲2.5%	▲84.6%
1999	▲158.1	▲39,943.7	▲86.3	▼21,796.6	▲5.7%	▲0.0%	▲2.8%	▲85.3%
2000	▲176.3	▲43,775.8	▲96.1	▲23,852.8	▲9.0%	▲1.3%	▼2.7%	▼82.3%
2001	▲178.4	▼43,104.2	▼89.8	▼21,699.7	▼-1.1%	▲1.0%	2.7%	▲94.5%
2002	▲188.3	▲45,080.2	▲92.5	▲22,159.8	▲3.9%	▲-0.4%	▲3.6%	▲96.3%
2003	▲200.7	▲48,774.7	▲97.6	▲23,730.4	▲4.5%	▲0.5%	▲4.0%	▲99.1%
2004	▲226.6	▲54,377.3	▲115.0	▲27,608.1	▲9.9%	▲1.7%	▼3.4%	▼95.7%
2005	▲250.9	▲58,815.0	▲127.8	▲29,961.3	▲7.4%	▲0.5%	▼3.1%	▼92.7%
2006	▲281.9	▲64,054.4	▲148.6	▲33,768.4	▲9.0%	▲1.0%	▼2.7%	▼86.5%
2007	▲315.7	▲68,793.8	▲180.9	▲39,432.9	▲9.0%	▲2.1%	▼2.1%	▲87.8%
2008	▲327.7	▼67,718.3	▲193.6	▲40,008.6	▲1.9%	▲6.6%	▲2.2%	▲97.9%
2009	▲330.2	▼66,212.2	▲194.2	▼38,926.8	▲0.1%	▲0.6%	▲3.0%	▲101.7%
2010	▲382.7	▲75,389.8	▲239.8	▲47,236.7	▲14.5%	▲2.8%	▼2.2%	▼98.7%
2011	▲415.0	▲80,052.4	▲279.4	▲53,891.5	▲6.2%	▲5.2%	▼2.0%	▲103.1%
2012	▲436.0	▲82,065.0	▲295.1	▲55,547.5	▲4.4%	▲4.6%	2.0%	▲106.7%
2013	▲448.1	▲83,001.8	▲307.6	▲56,967.4	▲4.8%	▲2.4%	▼1.9%	▼98.2%
2014	▲461.8	▲84,423.2	▲314.9	▲57,564.8	▲3.9%	▲1.0%	▲2.0%	▼97.7%
2015	▲481.4	▲86,974.7	▼308.0	▼55,645.6	▲3.0%	▲-0.5%	▼1.9%	▲102.2%
2016	▲501.5	▲89,436.6	▲318.8	▲56,858.5	▲3.6%	▲-0.5%	▲2.1%	▲106.6%
2017	▲534.9	▲95,310.3	▲343.2	▲61,149.6	▲4.7%	▲0.6%	▲2.2%	▲107.7%
2018	▲567.7	▲100,686.1	▲377.0	▲66,857.3	▲3.7%	▲0.4%	▼2.1%	▲109.4%
2019	▲584.2	▲102,431.4	▼375.5	▼65,833.2	▲1.1%	▲0.6%	▲2.3%	▲128.2%
2020	▼566.8	▼99,681.2	▼345.3	▼60,727.6	▼-4.1%	▲-0.2%	▲3.0%	▲152.0%
2021	▲635.3	▲116,486.3	▲397.0	▲72,794.9	▲7.6%	▲2.3%	▼2.7%	▲159.9%
2022	▲701.0	▲131,425.7	▲423.6	▲79,426.1	▲3.0%	▲5.5%	▼2.1%	▼141.1%
2023	▲742.3	▲140,280.1	▲447.2	▲84,500.4	▲2.3%	▲3.0%	2.1%	▼140.0%
2024	▲777.8	▲147,117.9	▲470.1	▲88,926.0	▲2.6%	▲2.0%	2.1%	▼139.9%
2025	▲811.9	▲152,667.0	▲491.2	▲92,363.0	▲2.5%	▲1.5%	2.1%	▲140.6%
2026	▲848.2	▲158,689.4	▲513.5	▲96,065.7	▲2.5%	▲1.5%	2.1%	▲141.2%
2027	▲886.1	▲164,987.2	▲536.8	▲99,935.1	▲2.5%	▲1.5%	2.1%	▲141.8%

== History ==
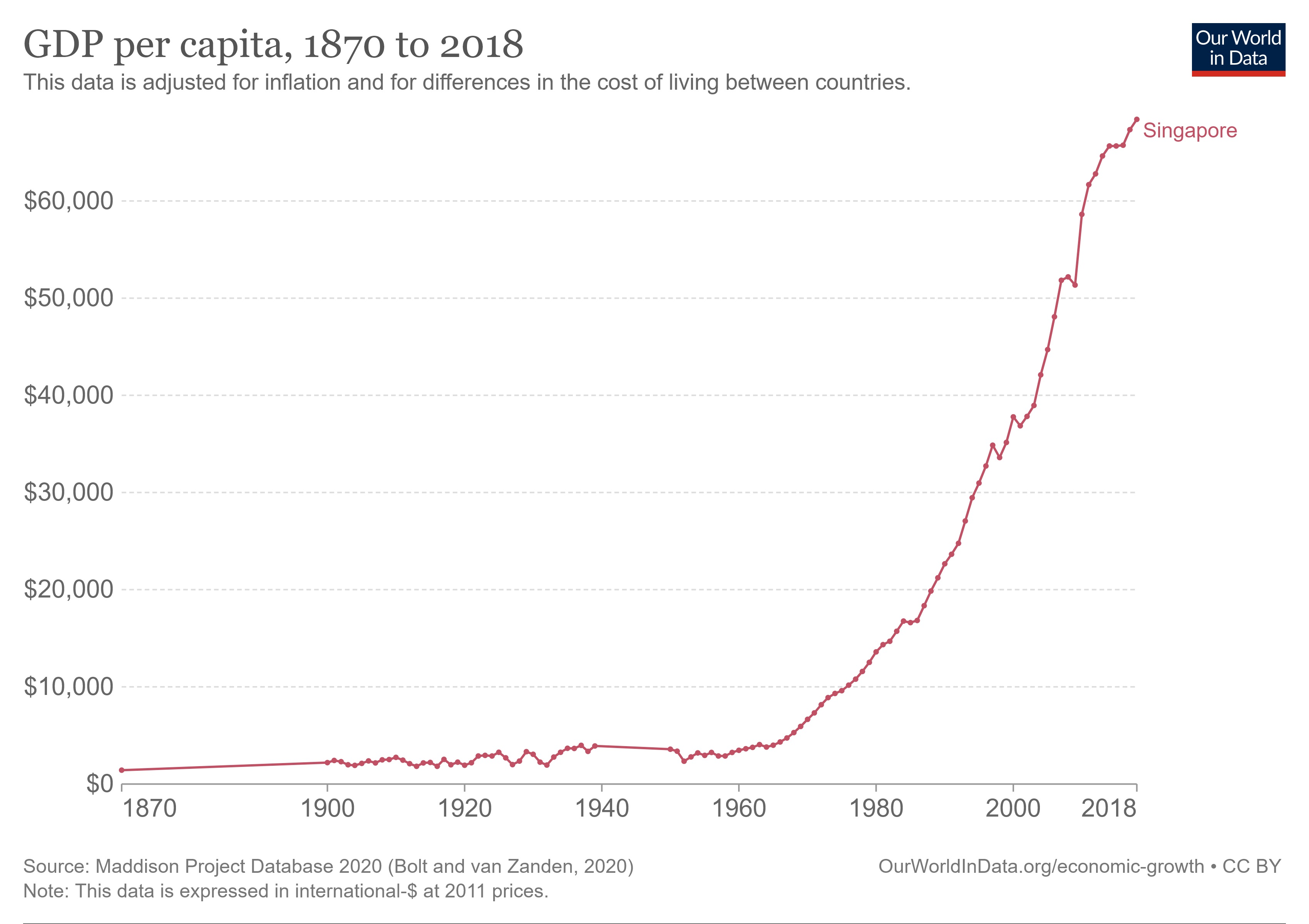
Historical GDP per capita development

=== British colonization ===
In 1819, Stamford Raffles, at the time Lieutenant-Governor of Bencoolen, established a trading post in Singapore. Raffles had been searching for a new settlement that could be used as an outpost of the British Empire. He left Calcutta and set out to explore much of South-East Asia. At the time, the Dutch Empire and British Empire were close economic rivals. Colonization enabled these empires to gain control of the vast resources of militarily weaker and economically less prosperous nations. Raffles was looking for a new settlement that could replace Malacca as a key economic advantage over the Dutch Empire. The former had been handed over to the Dutch under the Treaty of Vienna of 1815. Raffles found Singapore to be a perfect location, sitting just off the edge of the Straits of Malacca, nowadays one of the most important shipping lanes in the world. As well, the territory had key economic resources which would benefit the British. There was abundant timber and fresh water, and a natural deep water harbor which would be beneficial for the British fleet. He arrived on an island at the mouth of the Singapore River, where there was a small Malay settlement. At the time accompanied by William Farquhar, Raffles met with Temenggong (essentially, Chief of Security, for the settlement) Abdul Rahman to negotiate the right to establish a trading post on the island, under the British Empire. The island was ruled nominally from Johar on the peninsula by Tengku (essentially, Prince) Rahman, Sultan of Johor, who was heavily influenced by the Dutch and the Bugis. However, the Sultanate was weakened by factional division so that Temenggong Abdul Rahman and his officials were more loyal to Rahman's elder brother Tengku Hussein (or Tengku Long) who was living in exile in "Riau" (likely the Riau Archipelago). With the Temenggong's help, Raffles managed to smuggle Hussein back to Singapore. He offered to recognize Hussein as the rightful Sultan of Johor and provide him with a yearly stipend; in return, Hussein would grant the British the right to establish a trading post on Singapore. On 6 February 1819 Raffles succeeded in having the territory formally incorporated into the British Empire as the aforementioned trading post. Much of the settlement's rapid economic growth thereafter can be credited to its natural suitability as a seaport hub.

=== Trade expansion ===
On 17 November 1869, the Suez Canal opened, connecting the Mediterranean Sea to the Red Sea. This allowed for a decrease in travel time, which resulted in a rise in trade volume. The nation saw a $32 million rise just a year after its opening.

Trade volume reached $105 million Straits dollars in 1879, during which entrepot trade was the main source of income and trade alone accounted for more than one-third of GDP.

=== Independence ===
In the 1950s, the region saw social unrest which resulted in colonial powers deciding to relinquish some decision making. With spurs of race riots the colonial powers sought to empower and establish a formidable local government. With most of the unrest resulting from high unemployment, the local government was directed to solve this issue. The Economic Development Board was formed to empower the Singapore government in establishing, developing, and financing industrial undertakings.

In 1955, a Singapore local legislative Assembly with 25 out of 35 members elected was formed.

Upon independence from Malaysia in 1965, Singapore faced a small domestic market, and high levels of unemployment and poverty. 70 percent of Singapore's households lived in badly overcrowded conditions, and a third of its people squatted in slums on the city fringes. Unemployment averaged 14 percent, GDP per capita was US$516, and half of the population was illiterate.

=== Industrialisation boom and change ===
After Lee Kuan Yew was elected, he oversaw significant economic reforms to the country. Structural change and machinery propelled the economy during his tenure. Singapore was a small and densely populated nation, with very few natural resources and little space to grow outwards. Recognizing this, Lee identified that the key advantage that Singapore held was its human capital, and its ability to provide highly educated citizens capable of competing in global industry and trade. On 1 August 1961, the Singapore Government established the Economic Development Board to spearhead an investment drive, and make Singapore an attractive destination for foreign investment. FDI inflows increased greatly over the following decades, and by 2001 foreign companies accounted for 75% of manufactured output and 85% of manufactured exports. Meanwhile, Singapore's savings and investment rates rose among the highest levels in the world, while household consumption and wage shares of GDP fell among the lowest. The beginning of Lee's tenure was marked with success and from 1965 to 1973, annual growth of real GDP was 12.7%. He directed spending to repair and improve infrastructure. This effort spurred economic productivity and put in place the foundations needed to build up basic industry. As of 2019, Singapore's infrastructure is ranked the best in terms of quality, with a score of 95.4 out of 100. The period from 1973 to 1979 marked a struggle for Singapore as they pivoted away from basic infrastructure spending and moved towards more sustainable economic progress. The 1973 oil crisis raised government awareness of issues such as economic concentration. It forced the government to hold a new forum to discuss ways of adapting the country's economy to economic change. GDP growth during this time was slightly lower than the preceding years, at 8.5% annually. However, unemployment was virtually 0%, and most of the population had experienced great strides in productivity. The government highlighted a focus in technology and education to be the new wave of economic gain. In addition, they identified financial services as a key area in which Singapore could diversify and attract new growth. During this time, the government invested heavily in its budding financial services industry. It managed to minimize inflation and provide workers with the proper equipment and machinery to sustain growth.

=== Recent history ===
==== Growth in the service sector ====
As a result of this investment drive, Singapore's capital stock increased 33 times by 1992, and achieved a tenfold increase in the capital-labour ratio. Living standards steadily rose, with more families moving from a lower-income status to middle-income security with increased household incomes.

Under Lee, Singapore had both low inflation and unemployment. However, much unlike the economic policies of Greece and the rest of Europe, Singapore followed a policy of individualising the social safety net. This led to a higher than average savings rate.

In the late 1980s, Singapore's export-driven economic model required adjustment for further development. The 1990s emergence of efficient manufacturing firms in southeast Asia challenged the nation with such a small labor force and land restrictions. Friedrich noted how it would be "unlikely to expand beyond the current 25% share of the economy," when regarding manufacturing firms. Despite struggling in the manufacturing sector Singapore thrived in global finance, trading, and was an industrial hub for international trade. It positioned itself as a supplier of secondary factors, including expertise in management and industrial infrastructure, and emphasized a regionalization strategy through which it would invest in other Asian countries. Singaporean investment in China was a particularly important element of this strategy. To advance its regionalization strategy, Singapore began its Regional Industrial Parks Program to boost Singapore's domestic economy through profits from foreign industrial parks modeled on Singapore's Jurong Industrial Estate and also to build diplomatic ties in the host countries.

Singapore's economic strategy produced real growth averaging 8.0% from 1960 to 1999. Since the nation's independence in 1965, Singapore's GDP has amassed an average of a 9.5% increase. The economy picked up in 1999 under Goh Chok Tong, the Prime Minister of Singapore, after the regional financial crisis, with a growth rate of 5.4%, followed by 9.9% for 2000. However, the economic slowdown in the United States, Japan and the European Union, as well as the worldwide electronics slump, had reduced the estimated economic growth in 2001 to a negative 2.0%.

The economy expanded by 2.2% the following year, and by 1.1% in 2003 when Singapore was affected by the SARS outbreak. Subsequently, a major turnaround occurred in 2004 allowed it to make a significant recovery of 8.3% growth in Singapore, although the actual growth fell short of the target growth for the year more than half with only 2.5%. In 2005, economic growth was 6.4%; and in 2006, 7.9%.

It was apparent that Singapore would also struggle due to the 2008 financial crisis given its status as a financial services hub. Some market commentators doubted the economy's ability to cope with the effects of the crisis. In the end the economy grew in 2009 by 3.1% and in 2010, the nation saw a 15.2% growth rate.

As of 8 June 2013, Singapore's unemployment rate is around 1.9% and the country's economy has a lowered growth rate, with a rate of 1.8% on a quarter-by-quarter basis—compared to 14.8% in 2010.

2015 and 2016 saw a downturn for the nation as GDP growth shrunk to just 2 percent. Despite growth diminishing, the nation has yet to post negative growth rates which are a positive sign. During the same period of diminishing economic growth, unemployment and inflation have also decreased.

As of 2017 Singapore's GDP reached $323.907 billion.

Singapore is expected to experience an economic slowdown in 2019, with GDP growth slowing to 1.9% from 3.1% in 2018, due to tariff hikes from the United States and China.

During the initial months of the COVID-19 pandemic, on 26 March 2020, Singapore's Ministry of Trade and Industry said it believed that the economy would contract by between 1% and 4% in 2020. This was after the economy shrank 2.2% in the first quarter of 2020 from the same quarter in 2019. On 26 May, MTI said that it was revising down its expectation for the Singapore economy in 2020 to shrink by 4% to 7%. Economists had to downgrade their numbers from previously, and some suggested that the economic recovery could take some time. In response to the economic pressure, Moody's temporarily downgraded the Singapore banking sector that year from "stable" outlook to a "negative" outlook.

It was estimated by the economist Chua Hak Bin, the Singapore "circuit breaker" measures in response to the pandemic, beginning on 7 April could impact the economy to the tune of S$10 billion. With the lockdown imposed on construction workers, there were concerns that there could be delays in construction projects of up to six months. Senior Minister of State for Trade and Industry Chee Hong Tat announced that some 3,800 companies had closed in April 2020, only slightly higher than the 3,700 reported on average for the same month in the past 5 years, though he warned that this would likely rise in the following months. Despite this only small increase in companies shutting down, the number of companies starting up had declined by about a third from the average April since 2015.

== State enterprise and investment ==
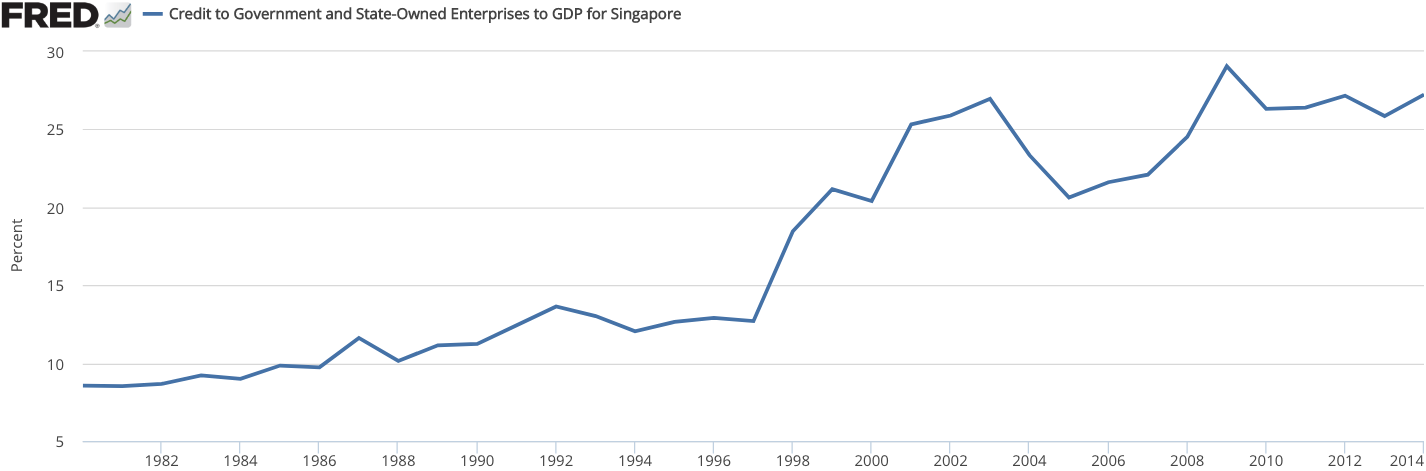
Ratio of credit to Singapore's State Owned Enterprises from domestic banks to the country's GDP

The public sector is used both as an investor and as a catalyst for economic development and innovation. The government of Singapore has two sovereign wealth funds, Temasek Holdings and GIC Private Limited, which are used to manage the country's reserves. Initially the state's role was oriented more toward managing industries for economic development, but in recent decades the objectives of Singapore's sovereign wealth funds have shifted to a commercial basis.

Government-linked corporations play a substantial role in Singapore's domestic economy. As of November 2011, the top six Singapore-listed GLCs accounted for about 17 percent of total capitalization of the Singapore Exchange (SGX). These fully and partially state-owned enterprises operate on a commercial basis and are granted no competitive advantage over privately owned enterprises. State ownership is prominent in strategic sectors of the economy, including telecommunications, media, public transportation, defence, port, airport operations as well as banking, shipping, airline, infrastructure and real estate.

As of 2014, Temasek holds S$69 billion of assets in Singapore, accounting for 7% of the total capitalization of Singapore-listed companies. In 2017, GSK shifted its Asian Headquarters to Singapore.

Year	Total trade	Imports	Exports	% Change
2000	$273	$135	$138	21%
2001				−9.4%
2002	$432			1.5%
2003	$516	$237	$279	9.6%
2004	$629	$293	$336	21.9%
2005	$716	$333	$383	14%
2006	$810	$379	$431	13.2%
2014	$983	$464	$519	21.3% change from 2006 to 2014

All figures in billions of Singapore dollars.

== Sectors ==
To maintain its competitive position despite rising wages, the government seeks to promote higher value-added activities in the manufacturing and services sectors. It also has opened, or is in the process of opening, the financial services, telecommunications, and power generation and retailing sectors up to foreign service providers and greater competition. The government has also attempted some measures including wage restraint measures and release of unused buildings in an effort to control rising commercial rents with the view to lowering the cost of doing business in Singapore when central business district office rents tripled in 2006.

=== Agriculture, aquaculture and forestry ===
Agriculture in Singapore is a small industry, contributing less than 0.5 percent of the country gross domestic product (GDP), as of 2010. There was a total of 153 land-based and 72 sea-based food farms in 2024, with value of total local food production estimated at S$231 million. Singapore also produces non-food agriculture items such as orchids, ornamental and foliage plants and ornamental fish for export and domestic markets. Singapore is a global exporter of quality cut orchids and ornamental fish.

In March 2019, the government of Singapore set the "30 by 30" goal which aims to produce 30% of its nutritional needs locally by 2030. In 2024, hen shell eggs, vegetable, and seafood farms contributed around 34%, 3%, and 6%, of Singapore's total food consumption respectively.

In November 2025, the government said it will revise its local production targets to produce 20 per cent of the country’s consumed fibre, such as leafy vegetables, and 30 per cent of protein, including seafood and eggs, by 2035. As of 2024, local consumption of Singapore-produced food items in the fibre and protein category are 8 percent and 26 percent respectively.

Aquaculture in Singapore is dominated by ornamental fish culture, followed by marine food fish culture. Known as "the capital of the ornamental fish industry", Singapore had brought in $76.7 million in 2019 and have traded with more than 80 countries. On the other hand, marine food fish culture only made up 10% of Singapore’s consumption of local fishes.

While majority of food fish culture today in Singapore are marine fish culture, before the 1980s, they consisted mainly of freshwater species. Most of these fishes consisted of carp, tilapia, and catfishes.

=== Banking ===
Singapore is considered a global financial hub by many leading financial analysts, economists and politicians, with Singapore banks offering world-class corporate bank account facilities. In the 2020 Global Financial Centres Index, Singapore was ranked as having the sixth most competitive financial sector in the world, and the fourth most competitive in Asia. These include multiple currencies, internet banking, telephone banking, current accounts, savings accounts, debit and credit cards, fixed term deposits and wealth management services. DBS, OCBC and UOB are the three major local banks of Singapore. In 2020, MAS granted license to digital banks for the first time. GXS Bank and MariBank are the two largest digital banks in Singapore.

Singapore has also attracted assets formerly held in Swiss banks for several reasons, including new taxes imposed on Swiss accounts and a weakening of Swiss bank secrecy. Credit Suisse, the second largest Swiss bank, moved its head of international private banking to Singapore in 2005. For this, the country has also been dubbed the "Switzerland of Asia".

In June 2026 Deputy Prime Minister Gan Kim Yong announced that Singapore will launch a gold clearing system in a bid to secure its position as a gold reserve amidst rising interest in the precious metal. The system is set to be active by October 2026 and will partner with six banks. DBS Group, one of the partner institutions, later announced it would begin offering tokenized physical gold to customers, with each token backed by a gram of gold.

=== Biotechnology and pharmaceutical ===
Singapore has been aggressively developing its biotechnology industry. Hundreds of millions of dollars were invested into the sector to build up infrastructure, fund research and development, and to recruit top international scientists to Singapore. Leading drug makers, such as GlaxoSmithKline (GSK), Pfizer and Merck & Co., have set up plants in Tuas Biomedical Park. In 2006 GSK invested another S$300 million to build another plant to produce paediatric vaccines, its first such facility in Asia. Pharmaceuticals now account for more than 8% of the country's manufacturing production. In 2022, the biopharma industry of Singapore accounted for manufacturing output of US$18 billion a year, a value that had tripled during two decades.

Biopolis serves as the main research and development centre for biomedical sciences in Singapore.

=== Chemical ===
Singapore's chemical industry is a cornerstone of its manufacturing sector, ranking among the world's top 10 energy and chemicals hub. Centered in Jurong Island, it specializes in petroleum, petrochemicals and high-value specialty chemicals, accounting for roughly 15.9% of Singapore's value-added manufacturing sector. The industry is shifting toward sustainability, decarbonization, and advanced manufacturing.

=== Defence ===
Singapore's defence industry is a growing, technology-based sector, with its industry is led by ST Engineering and supported by the Defence Science and Technology Agency and DSO National Laboratories for development of military technologies and capabilities.

=== Education ===
Education in Singapore is managed by the Ministry of Education (MOE). It controls the development and administration of state schools receiving taxpayers' funding, but also has an advisory and supervisory role in respect of private schools. For both private and state schools, there are variations in the extent of autonomy in their curriculum, scope of taxpayers' aid and funding, tuition burden on the students, and admission policy.

Education spending usually makes up about 20 per cent of the annual national budget, which subsidises state education and government-assisted private education for Singaporean citizens and funds the Edusave programme. Non-citizens bear significantly higher costs of educating their children in Singapore government and government-aided schools. In 2000, the Compulsory Education Act codified compulsory education for children of primary school age (excepting those with disabilities), and made it a criminal offence for parents to fail to enroll their children in school and ensure their regular attendance. Exemptions are allowed for homeschooling or full-time religious institutions, but parents must apply for exemption from the Ministry of Education and meet a minimum benchmark.

The main language of instruction in Singapore is English, which was officially designated the first language within the local education system in 1987. English is the first language learned by half the children by the time they reach preschool age and becomes the primary medium of instruction by the time they reach primary school. Although Malay, Mandarin and Tamil are also official languages, English is the language of instruction for nearly all subjects except the official Mother Tongue languages and the literatures of those languages; these are generally not taught in English, although there is provision for the use of English at the initial stages. Certain schools, such as secondary schools under the Special Assistance Plan (SAP), encourage a richer use of the mother tongue and may occasionally teach subjects in Mandarin Chinese.

Singapore's education system has been consistently ranked as one of the highest in the world by the OECD. It is believed that this comes from the style of teaching that is implemented in Singapore. Teachers focus on making sure that each of their students thoroughly move through the syllabus before moving on. By doing this teachers in Singapore teach a much more narrow but deeper type of instruction. Furthermore, it has been described as "world-leading" and in 2010 was among those picked out for commendation by the Conservative former UK Education Secretary Michael Gove. According to PISA, an influential worldwide study on educational systems, Singapore has the highest performance in international education and tops in global rankings. In 2020, Singaporean students made up half of the perfect scorers in the International Baccalaureate (IB) examinations worldwide.

=== Energy ===
Singapore is the pricing centre and leading oil trading hub in Asia. The oil industry makes up 5% of Singapore's GDP, with Singapore being one of the top three export refining centres in the world. In 2007, it exported 68.1 million tonnes of oil. The oil industry has led to the promotion of the chemical industry as well as oil and gas equipment manufacturing. Singapore has 70 per cent of the world market for both jack-up rigs and for the conversion of Floating Production Storage Offloading units. It has 20 per cent of the world market for ship repair, and in 2008 the marine and offshore industry employed almost 70,000 workers.

Singapore has limited potential for renewable energy mainly due to its small surface area; solar power holds the greatest potential. The government set a target of generating solar power to cover 350,000 households in 2030 that would equal to 4% of the country's electricity demand in 2020. As a financial hub, Singapore can play an important role in attracting investment in renewable energy in the entire ASEAN region.

=== Healthcare ===
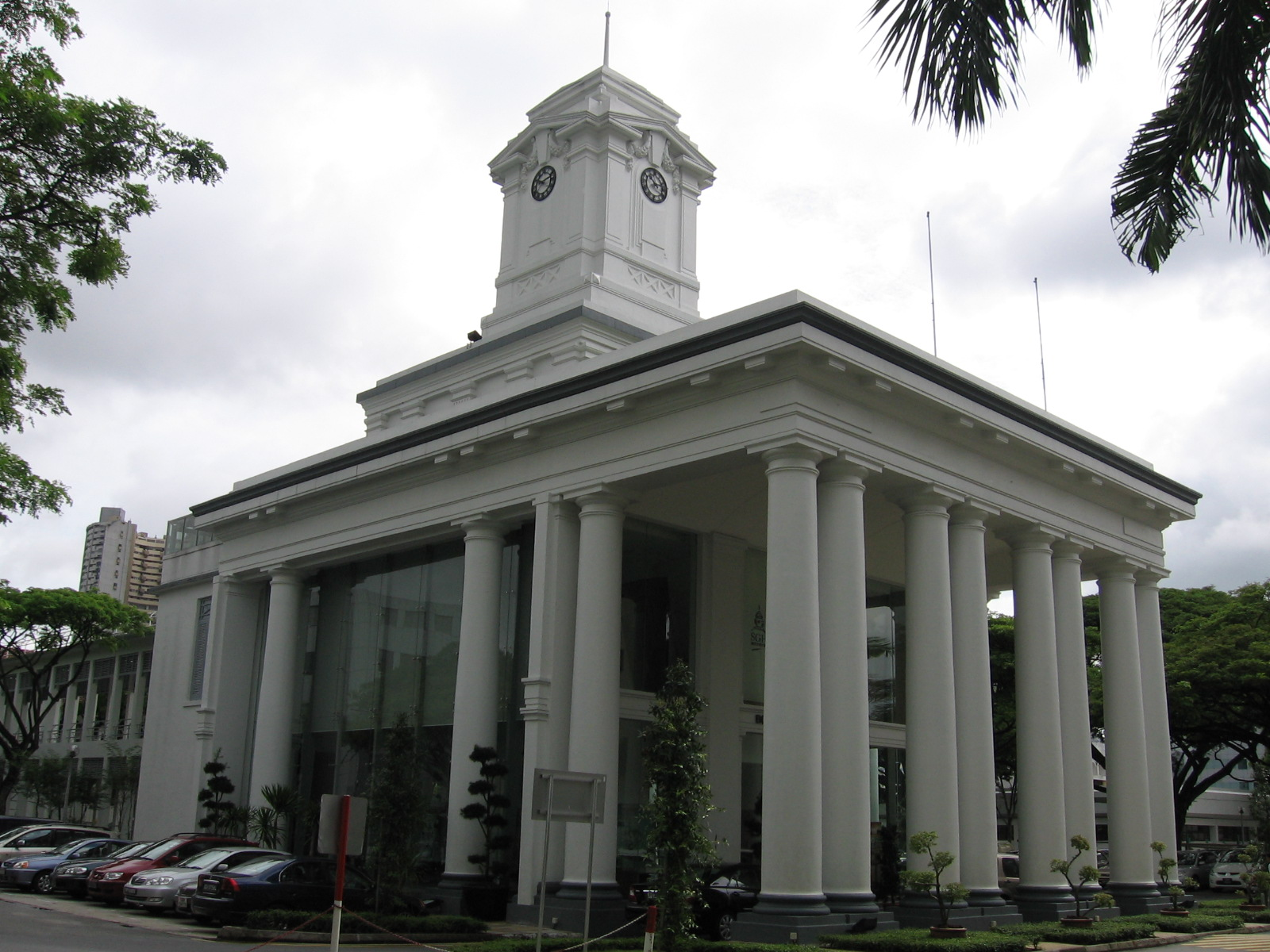
The Bowyer Block at the Singapore General Hospital now houses the SGH Museum which was officially opened in May 2005.

Healthcare in Singapore is under the purview of the Ministry of Health of the Government of Singapore. It mainly consists of a government-run publicly funded universal healthcare system as well as a significant private healthcare sector. Financing of healthcare costs is done through a mixture of direct government subsidies, compulsory comprehensive savings, national healthcare insurance, and cost-sharing.

The Singaporean public health insurance system is based on programs run by the Central Provident Fund, primarily Medisave, a mandatory medical savings account scheme. All working citizens and permanent residents are obligated to set aside a portion of their income into Medisave accounts, which they can draw upon to pay their own medical bills and those of their immediate family. The Central Provident Fund also manages the MediShield and MediFund insurance schemes, which cover people with insufficient savings or those who have depleted their savings. In addition, the government provides subsidies for the medical expenses of citizens and permanent residents who receive treatment in public hospitals.

Singapore generally has an efficient and widespread system of healthcare. In 2000, Singapore was ranked 6th in the World Health Organization's ranking of the world's health systems. Bloomberg ranked Singapore's healthcare system the most efficient in the world in 2014. The Economist Intelligence Unit placed Singapore 2nd out of 166 countries for health-care outcomes. Bloomberg Global Health Index of 163 countries ranked Singapore the 4th healthiest country in the world and first in Asia.

Development of life expectancy in Singapore

As of 2019, Singaporeans have the world's longest life expectancy, 84.8 years at birth. Women can expect to live an average of 87.6 years with 75.8 years in good health. The averages for men are lower, with a life expectancy at 81.9 years with 72.5 years in good health.

According to global consulting firm Towers Watson, Singapore has "one of the most successful healthcare systems in the world, in terms of both efficiency in financing and the results achieved in community health outcomes". For the most part, the government does not directly regulate the costs of private medical care. These costs are largely subject to market forces, and vary enormously within the private sector, depending on the medical specialty and service provided.

=== Manufacturing ===
==== Hard disk drive ====
In the 1980s, US companies began assembling hard disk drives (HDD) in Singapore. They were attracted by factors including government incentives and the availability of skilled labor. By the mid 1990s, the six largest HDD companies in the world manufactured in Singapore. However, foreign firms based in Singapore began to move assembly to nearby countries with lower costs in the late 1980s.

==== Semiconductor ====
The semiconductor industry in Singapore has largely produced low-end chips, for products such as electric cars or smartphones. After Texas Instruments and National Semiconductor set up semiconductor plants in Singapore for assembly and testing in 1968, other major industry players soon followed. In 1984, SGS-Thomson set up a wafer fabrication plant in Singapore, with other manufacturers following since. Singapore state-owned Temasek Holdings agreed to sell its 62% stake in Singapore-listed Chartered Semiconductor, which had been the world's third-largest foundry, to Abu Dhabi's Advanced Technology Investment Company in 2009.

=== Real estate ===
The Singapore government also owns 90 per cent of the country's land, as well as housing in which 80 per cent of the population lives. The Housing and Development Board is Singapore's public housing authority. Singapore housing market comprises three main types: public HDB flats (subsidised high-rise), private condominiums (with shared facilities) and landed properties (houses on private land). The majority, ~77% of residents live in HDB flats, while private condominiums (17.9%) and landed properties (4.7%) make up the rest.

In July 2022, a report by Savills revealed that Singapore tied with New York City in recording the highest rental growth rate for luxury homes globally.

=== Telecommunications ===
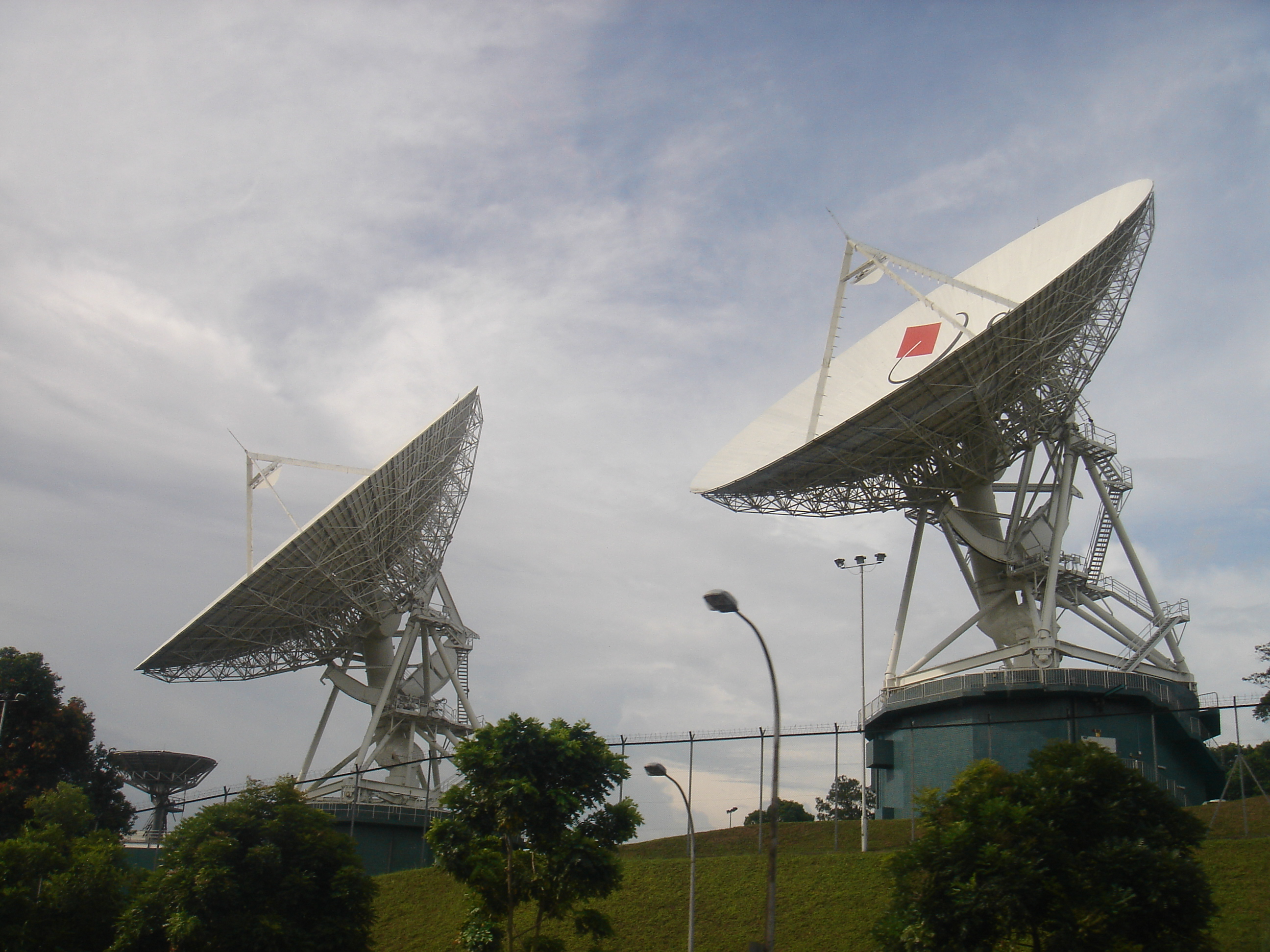
Satellite dishes of the Bukit Timah Satellite Earth Station, along the Bukit Timah Expressway.

The telecommunication infrastructure of Singapore spans the entire city-state. Its development level is high, with close accessibility to the infrastructure from nearly all inhabited parts of the island and for all of the population, with exceptions. Today, the country is considered an international telecommunications hub, an achievement that was driven by Singapore's view that high-quality telecommunications is one of the critical factors that support its economic growth.

=== Tourism ===
Tourism plays an important role in the economy of Singapore. Singapore ranks among the most visited cities in the world.

=== Transport ===
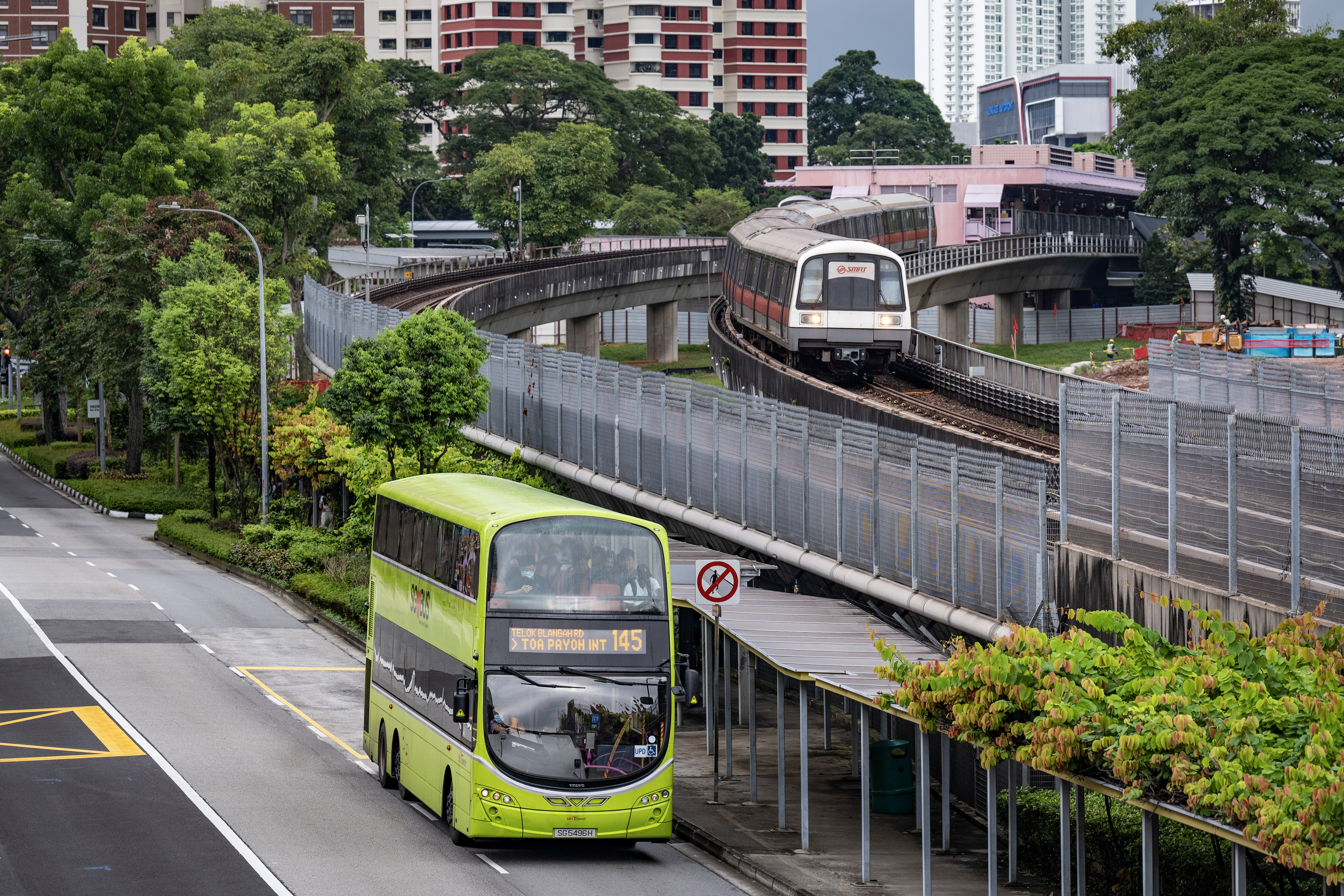
Buses and trains are some of the common modes of transport in Singapore.

Transport in Singapore is predominantly land-based, with a comprehensive network of roads making many parts of the city-state, including islands such as Sentosa and Jurong Island, accessible. The road network is complemented by a robust rail system consisting of the Mass Rapid Transit (MRT) and the Light Rail Transit (LRT), which cover the length and width of Singapore and serve a few neighbourhoods respectively. The main island of Singapore is also connected to other islands via ferryboat services. Furthermore, the city-state maintains strong international connections through two bridges linking it to Malaysia – the Causeway and the Second Link – and the Singapore Changi Airport, a major aviation hub in Asia.

Singapore's transport system is globally recognized for its reliability, efficiency and effectiveness. According to McKinsey's Urban Transportation report, it ranks as the world's best overall, excelling in five criteria: availability, affordability, efficiency, convenience, and sustainability. A study by London consulting firm Credo further highlights the cost-efficiency of Singapore's public transport networks, with integrated multi-modal (bus and train) single-journey regular trunk adult card-based fares ranging from S$0.99 to S$2.26. The Monthly Travel Pass, offering unlimited bus and train rides, is set at S$128 per month.

Public transport, encompassing public buses and the MRT and LRT rail networks, is the most common mode of transportation within the city-state and is far better developed than in the other ASEAN member states. The Land Transport Authority (LTA) fully integrates public transport, with state ownership and public financing of the public infrastructure and public capital assets of railways and buses. The operation and maintenance of these systems are tendered to bidding operator companies on contract.

Private transport, including cars, motorcycles, and commercial vehicles, is less commonly used due to the country's limited land space and dense population. The LTA has controlled and limited the private vehicle population through the Vehicle Quota System (VQS) ownership market-based license auctions since 1990. High taxes, such as the Certificate of Entitlement (COE) and Additional Registration Fee (ARF), make private vehicle ownership prohibitively expensive, leading to Singapore's reputation as the most expensive country in the world to own a car.

In recent years, Singapore has emerged as a preferred location for the testing and development of autonomous vehicles.

=== Water supply and sanitation ===
Water supply and sanitation in Singapore are intricately linked to the historical development of Singapore. It is characterised by a number of outstanding achievements in a challenging environment with geographical limitations. Access to water in Singapore is universal, affordable, efficient and of high quality.

Innovative hydraulic engineering and integrated water management approaches such as the reuse of reclaimed water, the establishment of protected areas in urban rainwater catchments and the use of estuaries as freshwater reservoirs have been introduced along with seawater desalination in order to reduce the country's dependence on untreated imported water.

As a result of such efforts, Singapore has achieved self-sufficiency with its water supply since the mid-2010s. Examples include its "Four National Taps" for its water supply. Five desalination plants (Note: The five desalination plants are: SingSpring Desalination Plant, Tuas South Desalination Plant (TSDP), Tuas Desalination Plant (TDP), Keppel Marina East Desalination Plant (KMEDP), and Jurong Island Desalination Plant (JIDP).) have been opened throughout the country since 2003, which in total are able to produce a maximum capacity of approximately 195,000 million imperial gallons (890,000,000 m^{3}) per day.

Singapore's approach does not simply rely on physical infrastructure, but it also emphasises proper legislation and enforcement, water pricing, public education as well as research and development. In 2007, Singapore's water and sanitation utility, the Public Utilities Board, received the Stockholm Industry Water Award for its holistic approach to water resources management.

Singapore was also the first country in Asia to institute a comprehensive fluoridation programme which covers the entirety of its population. The water was fluoridated at 0.7 ppm using sodium silicofluoride.

== International trade and investment ==
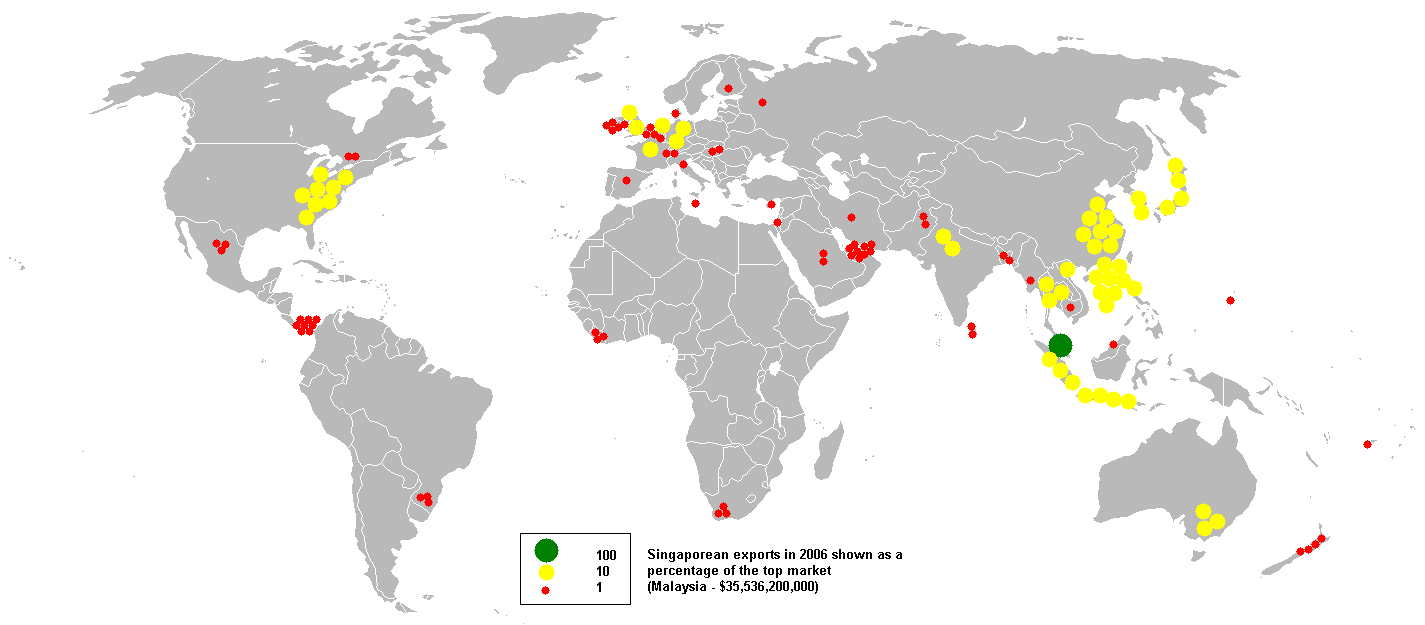
Singaporean exports in 2006

Exports of Singapore by product category (2019) Chemical products Transportation Machines Mineral products Plastics and rubbers Metals Foodstuffs Precious metals Textiles Instruments Animal products Vegetable products Paper goods Footwear and headwear Miscellaneous Stone and glass Wood products Animal and vegetable bi-products Animal hides Arts and antiques Weapons

Singapore's total trade in 2022 amounted to $1,365.4 billion SGD. In 2022, Singapore's imports were $655.4 billion SGD and exports were $710.0 billion SGD. China was Singapore's main import partner, as well as its largest export market in 2021. Singapore's major trading partners include Malaysia, the United States and the European Union.

China is Singapore's largest trading partner, with bilateral trade totalling roughly 175 billion Singapore dollars in 2022. Since 2009, the value of exports exceeds imports for Singapore's trade with China. In comparison, the value of imports exceeds exports for Singapore's trade with the US since 2006.

Re-exports accounted for 43% of Singapore's total sales to other countries in 2000. Singapore's principal exports are electronic components, refined petroleum, gold, computers, and packaged medications. Singapore's main imports are electronic components, refined petroleum, crude petroleum, gold, and computers.

Trade in Singapore has benefited from the extensive network of trade agreements Singapore has implementing. According to Hawksford, Singapore may benefit from preferential market access across parts of the ASEAN network, with import duties potentially reduced for certain goods and scenarios when trading with Indonesia, Malaysia, the Philippines, Thailand, Brunei, Myanmar, Cambodia, Laos and Vietnam.

The Singapore Economic Development Board (EDB) continues to attract investment funds on a large-scale for the country despite the city's relatively high-cost operating environment. The US leads in foreign investment, accounting for 40% of new commitments to the manufacturing sector in 2000. As of 1999, cumulative investment for manufacturing and services by American companies in Singapore reached approximately $20 billion (total assets). The bulk of US investment is in electronics manufacturing, oil refining and storage, and the chemical industry. More than 1,500 US firms operate in Singapore.

Singapore's largely corruption-free government, skilled workforce, and advanced and efficient infrastructure have attracted investments from more than 3,000 multinational corporations (MNCs) from the United States, Japan, and Europe. Foreign firms are found in almost all sectors of the economy. MNCs account for more than two-thirds of manufacturing output and direct export sales, although certain services sectors remain dominated by government-linked corporations.

The government also has encouraged firms to invest outside Singapore, with the country's total direct investments abroad (DIA) reaching S$1,636 billion by the end of 2024. Mainland China was the top investment destination, accounting for S$228 billion of total DIA, followed by India (121 billion), United Kingdom (110 billion), Netherlands (110 billion) and Indonesia (100 billion). The rapidly growing economy of India, especially the high technology sector, is becoming an expanding source of foreign investment for Singapore.

The United States strives to improve bilateral trade with Singapore and has signed the US-Singapore Free Trade Agreement in 2003. Singapore corporate tax is 17 per cent.

Singapore is the European Union's 14th largest trading partner. Singapore-EU trade is worth more than €50 billion euros a year. Singapore is also the EU's 5th largest trade in services partner and the EU's 6th destination for foreign direct investment. Over 10,000 EU companies have set up their hubs or offices in Singapore.

In 2018, the EU and Singapore signed the EUSFTA, a free trade agreement which aims to boost and promote trade between Singapore and the EU. The agreement includes provisions on:

- Eliminating tariffs on goods
- Harmonizing safety, testing and labeling standards (for cars and vehicle parts, electronics and textiles)
- Preferential market access and equal treatment for services (for telecommunications, financial services, transport, etc.)
- Simplifying customs procedures and improving trade facilitation
- Improved protection of intellectual property
- Guaranteed access to government procurement contracts
- Legally-binding commitments on environmental protection and workers' rights

In addition to the free trade agreement, the EU and Singapore signed an investment protection agreement which aims to encourage investment between Singapore and the EU. It ensures that governments in the EU and Singapore treat each other's investors equally, and replaces old-style bilateral investment treaties between Singapore and individual EU countries.

=== International trade agreements ===
The following bilateral and plurilateral agreements are currently in effect. Signature and entry into force dates are as listed by the World Trade Organization.

Economy	Agreement	Abbreviation	Concluded	Signed	Effective	Legal text
Australia	Comprehensive Strategic Partnership	CSP	6 May 2016	2015		
New Zealand	Agreement between New Zealand and Singapore on a Closer Economic Partnership	ANZSCEP	18 August 2000	14 November 2000	1 January 2001	
EFTA	Agreement between the EFTA States and Singapore	EFTA-Singapore FTA	11 April 2002	26 June 2002	1 January 2003	
Japan	Japan–Singapore Economic Partnership Agreement	JSEPA	October 2001	13 January		
United States	United States-Singapore Free Trade Agreement	USSFTA	19 November 2002	6 May 2003	1 January 2004	
Jordan	Singapore Jordan Free Trade Agreement	SJFTA	29 April 2004	16 May 2004		
Brunei	Trans-Pacific Strategic Economic Partnership Agreement	Trans-Pacific SEP		August 2005	1 January 2006	
Chile	Trans-Pacific Strategic Economic Partnership Agreement	Trans-Pacific SEP		18 July 2005	1 January 2006	
New Zealand	Trans-Pacific Strategic Economic Partnership Agreement	Trans-Pacific SEP		18 July 2005	1 January 2006	
India	India – Singapore Comprehensive Economic Cooperation Agreement	India-Singapore CECA	November 2004	29 June 2005	1 August 2005	
South Korea	Korea-Singapore Free Trade Agreement	KSFTA	28 November 2004	4 August 2005	End 2005	
Peru	Peru-Singapore Free Trade Agreement	PesFTA	September 2007	29 May 2008	Early 2009	
Sri Lanka	Sri Lanka-Singapore Free Trade Agreement	Sri Lanka-Singapore FTA	2016	23 January 2018	Mid 2018	
European Union	European Union-Singapore Free Trade Agreement	EUSFTA	2018	19 October 2018	21 November 2019	
United Kingdom	Singapore–United Kingdom Free Trade Agreement	SUKFTA	10 December 2020	10 December 2020	1 January 2021	

== Labour workforce ==
In 2000, Singapore had a workforce of about 2.2 million. With limited access to natural resources, Singapore had been forced to invest in its people. The country has the largest proficiency of English language speakers in Asia, making it an attractive place for multinational corporations. Singapore has come a long way from where it once stood. In the 1970s according to Tilak Abeysinghe "2.4 percent of the labor force were degree holders". By 1990 the number rose to just 6.3%. In 2013 the percentage of the labor force who held degrees reached 31%. The nation's directive toward high skilled labor jobs, has promoted both growth and education to the region. The National Trades Union Congress (NTUC), the sole trade union federation, which has a symbiotic relationship with the ruling party, accounts for almost 99% of total organised labour. Government policy and pro-activity rather than labour legislation controls general labour and trade union matters.

The Employment Act offers little protection to white-collar workers due to an income threshold. The Industrial Arbitration Court handles labour-management disputes that cannot be resolved informally through the Ministry of Manpower. The Singapore Government has stressed the importance of co-operation between unions, management and government (tripartism), as well as the early resolution of disputes. There has been only one strike in the past 15 years.

Singapore has enjoyed virtually full employment for long periods of time. Amid an economic slump, the unemployment rate rose to 4.0% by the end of 2001, from 2.4% early in the year. Unemployment has since declined and as of 2012 the unemployment rate stands at 1.9%.

While the Singapore government has taken a stance against minimum wage and unemployment benefit schemes, in 2007 the government introduced a Workfare Income Supplement (WIS) scheme to supplement wages of low-skilled workers. To support employers in hiring older Singaporean workers, Special Employment Credit (SEC) was introduced in 2011. It was first enhanced in 2012 to provide employers with support in hiring older Singaporean workers and Persons with Disabilities (PWDs). It helped the employers to cope with costs associated with the increase in contribution rates for older workers in their compulsory comprehensive savings and pension system, the Central Provident Fund (CPF). The 5-year SEC scheme was further extended an additional 3 years, up to 2019 to encourage employers to voluntarily re-employ older workers aged 65 and above.

The Singapore Government and the NTUC have tried a range of programs to increase lagging productivity and boost the labour force participation rates of women and older workers. However, labour shortages persist in the service sector and in many low-skilled positions in the construction and electronics industries. Foreign workers help make up this shortfall. In 2000, there were about 600,000 foreign workers in Singapore, constituting 27% of the total work force. As a result, wages are relatively suppressed or do not rise for all workers. To have some controls, the government imposes a foreign worker levy payable by employers for low end workers like domestic help and construction workers. In 2012, the Ministry of Trade and Industry (MTI) reported that Singapore should continue to fine-tune the calibration of its inflow of foreigners as the country continues to face an ageing population and a shrinking workforce. Singapore Parliament accepted the recommendations by its Economic Strategies Committee (ESC) for the optimal ratio of the level of immigration and foreign manpower for both high and low skilled workers. The Government recognises that the current overall foreign workforce should complement the local resident workforce and not replace the Singaporean Core concept, and helps companies greatly as they raise productivity through business restructuring and workforce retraining; raise resident labour force participation rate.

== Poverty and economic inequality ==
Singapore is one of the world's wealthiest countries per capita, but its Gini coefficient is high in comparison to developed countries. Statistics on income inequality are published by the Singapore Department of Statistics. Without taking taxes and social transfers into account, Singapore's gini coefficient puts the country in the medium range. Nevertheless, the country remains on the "very high" category on the inequality-adjusted human development index (IHDI), a ranking similar to the Human Development Index (HDI), but with inequality also accounted for.

In October 2018, Oxfam ranked Singapore 149 out of 157 in its Commitment to Reducing Inequality Index 2018, placing it among the bottom ten of the countries in the index, which ranks countries based on efforts to reduce economic inequality. In its report, Oxfam accused Singapore of practices which encouraged "harmful tax practices", not having a universal minimum wage (apart from janitors and security guards), and poor performance on labour rights. The government responded to the report by claiming that it was more important to look at "real outcomes" such as Singapore's high home ownership, health, education, and employment, rather than public spending or tax rates, also saying that the report "assumes that high taxation and high public expenditure reflects commitment to combating inequality".

The government provides social support through a variety of social assistance schemes. The Ministry of Social and Family Development runs ComCare, a program which provides income support for low-income citizen households through various schemes for short-to-medium term assistance, long-term assistance, child support, and urgent financial needs. The Community Development Councils also run various local assistance schemes within their districts. The Ministry of Manpower runs a Silver Support Scheme which provides additional financial support for low-income elderly with no family support. Meanwhile, the Ministry of Health also runs MediFund to assist families that have difficulty paying for medical bills despite government subsidies and other health financing schemes. In addition, the National Council of Social Service coordinates a range of 450 non-government voluntary welfare organisations to provide social services, while raising funds through The Community Chest of Singapore.

As of 2016, low and middle-income groups received 2.5 times the public subsidies they did ten years earlier.

== Public finance ==
Government spending in Singapore has risen since the start of the 2008 financial crisis, from around 15% of GDP in 2008 to 17% in 2012. The government's total expenditure as a percentage of GDP ranks among the lowest internationally and allows for a competitive tax regime. Singapore is required under its constitution to keep a balanced budget over each term of government. Singapore government debt is issued for investment purposes, not to fund expenditure.

Personal income taxes in Singapore range from 0% to 22% for incomes above S$320,000. There are no capital gains or inheritance taxes in Singapore. Singapore's corporate tax rate is 17% with exemptions and incentives for smaller businesses. Singapore has a single-tier corporate income tax system, which means there is no double-taxation for shareholders.

Singapore introduced Goods and Services Tax (GST) with an initial rate of 3% on 1 April 1994, increasing government's revenue by S$1.6 billion (US$1b, €800m) and establishing government finances. The GST rate increased to 4% in 2003, 5% in 2004, 7% in 2007, 8% in 2023, and 9% in 2024.

The Singapore government owns two investment companies, GIC Private Limited and Temasek Holdings, which manage Singapore's reserves. Both operate as commercial investment holding companies independently of the Singapore government, but former Prime Minister Lee Hsien Loong and his wife Ho Ching serve as chairman and CEO of these corporations respectively. While GIC invests abroad, Temasek holds 31% of its portfolio in Singapore, holding majority stakes in several of the nation's largest companies, such as Singapore Airlines, Singtel, ST Engineering and Mediacorp. As of 2014, Temasek holds S$69 billion of assets in Singapore, accounting for 7% of the total capitalisation of Singapore-listed companies.

In April 2013, the country was recognised as an increasingly popular tax haven for the wealthy due to the low tax rate on personal income, a full tax exemption on income that is generated outside of Singapore and 69 double taxation treaties that can minimise both withholding tax and capital gains tax. Australian millionaire retailer Brett Blundy, with an estimated personal wealth worth AU$835 million, and multi-billionaire Facebook co-founder Eduardo Saverin are two examples of wealthy individuals who have settled in Singapore (Blundy in 2013 and Saverin in 2012). Additionally, Australian mining magnate Gina Rinehart owns property in Singapore and American investor Jim Rogers moved to Singapore in 2007—Rogers has identified the 21st century as an era in which Asia will dominate and wishes for his two daughters to learn Mandarin as a key outcome of the relocation. Chinese Media TV celebrities Jet Li and Gong Li have also taken up naturalised Singapore citizenship.

== Monetary policy ==
The Monetary Authority of Singapore (MAS) is Singapore's central bank and financial regulatory authority. Its current chairman is Prime Minister Lawrence Wong (July 2023–present). It administers the various statutes pertaining to money, banking, insurance, securities and the financial sector in general, as well as currency issuance. The MAS has been given powers to act as a banker to and financial agent of the Government. It has also been entrusted to promote monetary stability, and credit and exchange policies conducive to the growth of the economy.

Unlike many other central banks such as Federal Reserve System, European Central Bank or Bank of England, MAS does not regulate the monetary system via interest rates to influence the liquidity in the system. Instead, it chooses to do it via the foreign exchange mechanism, which it has been doing since 1981. In doing so it manages the Singapore dollar versus a number of currencies that they do not reveal publicly – a Singapore dollar nominal effective exchange rate (S$ NEER). It carries this out by intervening in the SGD market as well as other operations in the money market. The MAS reviews its policy stance less frequently than most central banks, in a cycle that is around every 6 months. In some circumstances, such as during the COVID-19 pandemic MAS can change the date of its twice yearly meeting.

In May 2022, six major banks agreed to pay $64.5 million to resolve antitrust allegations that they worked together to rig benchmark Singapore interest rates. The banks involved included Credit Suisse AG, Deutsche Bank AG, The Hongkong and Shanghai Banking Corporation Limited, ING Bank N.V., Citibank N.A. and JPMorgan Chase & Co.

Policy decisions
Date	Changes
22 February 2001	gradual modest appreciation rate of appreciation of SGD NEER band.
10 April 2001	gradual modest appreciation rate of appreciation of SGD NEER band.
12 July 2001	zero percent rate of appreciation of SGD NEER band.
10 October 2001	zero percent rate of appreciation of SGD NEER band; width widened.
2 January 2002	zero percent rate of appreciation of SGD NEER band; width narrowed.
14 October 2016	zero percent rate of appreciation of SGD NEER band; no change to width and the level at which it is centred.
13 April 2017	zero percent rate of appreciation of SGD NEER band; no change to width and the level at which it is centred.
13 October 2017	zero percent rate of appreciation of SGD NEER band; no change to width and the level at which it is centred.
13 April 2018	slightly increase rate of appreciation of SGD NEER band; no change to width and the level at which it is centred.
12 October 2018	slightly increase rate of appreciation of SGD NEER band; no change to width and the level at which it is centred.
12 April 2019	unchanged rate of appreciation of SGD NEER band; no change to width and the level at which it is centred.
14 October 2019	slightly reduce rate of appreciation, with no change in width.
30 March 2020	zero percent per annum rate of appreciation, starting at the prevailing level with no change in width.
14 October 2020	There was no change in foreign exchange policy from the March decision. This was expected by all economists.

== Property policy ==
To dampen property speculation, the government imposed Additional Buyer's Stamp Duty (ABSD) starting in December 2011. It was subsequently raised in January 2013 and then again in July 2018. Currently for Singapore citizens buying their first property, there is no ABSD. For their second property onwards, they pay up to 15% ABSD. For foreigners the ABSD rate is 60% no matter if it is the first property. And for entities it is 65%. At the same time they raised the ABSD in 2018, the MAS tightened rules on housing loans, by limiting the loan tenure and reducing the Loan-to-Value ratio.

== Mergers and acquisitions ==
16,156 mergers and acquisitions deals have been conducted in Singapore so far, which accumulated to a total value of US$850 bil. Since 1985 there has been a constant upward trend, disrupted only in 2002 and 2009. The most active year in terms of numbers (926) and value (US$78 bil.) has been 2017, so there is currently an all-time high. In general inbound and outbound deals in Singapore are nearly equally distributed.

Here is a list of the top 10 deals with Singaporean participation inbound or outbound:

Date Announced	Acquiror Name	Acquiror Mid Industry	Acquiror Nation	Target Name	Target Mid Industry	Target Nation	Value of Transaction ($mil)
2 January 2008	Shining Prospect Pte Ltd	Other Financials	Singapore	Rio Tinto PLC	Metals & Mining	United Kingdom	14,284.17
7 September 2015	Petrol Complex Pte Ltd	Oil & Gas	Singapore	Essar Oil Ltd	Oil & Gas	India	12,907.25
14 July 2017	Nesta Investment Holdings Ltd	Other Financials	China	Global Logistic Properties Ltd	Non Residential	Singapore	11,553.58
12 October 2016	QHG Shares Pte Ltd	Other Financials	Singapore	Rosneft Oil Co	Oil & Gas	Russian Fed	10,776.55
12 October 2007	Government of Singapore Invest	Alternative Financial Investments	Singapore	UBS AG	Banks	Switzerland	9,760.42
26 March 2001	Singapore Telecommunications	Wireless	Singapore	Cable & Wireless Optus Lt	Telecommunications Services	Australia	8,491.12
12 January 2014	Investor Group	Other Financials	Singapore	IndCor Properties Inc	REITs	United States	8,100.00
30 March 2007	Investor Group	Other Financials	Singapore	Alinta Ltd	Oil & Gas	Australia	7,500.98
13 September 2012	TCC Assets Ltd	Other Financials	British Virgin	Fraser & Neave Ltd	Food and Beverage	Singapore	6,896.48
15 January 2008	Government of Singapore Invest	Alternative Financial Investments	Singapore	Citigroup Inc	Banks	United States	6,880.00

== Facts and figures ==
Percentage of economic growth: 1.7% (2016)

Industrial production growth rate: 1% (2016 est.)

Electricity – production by source:
fossil fuel: 95.3%
hydro: 0%
nuclear: 0%
other: 3.9% (2014 est.)

Electricity – consumption: 47.5 TWh (2016)

Electricity – exports: 0 kWh (2007)

Electricity – imports: 0 kWh (2007)

Agriculture – products: rubber, copra, fruit, vegetables; poultry, eggs, fish, orchids, ornamental fish

Currency: 1 Singapore dollar (S$ or SGD) = 100 cents

Exchange rates:

Year	Singapore Dollars per US$1
1981	2.0530
1985	2.1213
1990	1.7275
1995	1.4148
2000	1.7361
2005	1.6738
2011	1.2573
2012	1.2498
2013	1.2513
2014	1.2671
2015	1.3748
2016	1.379
2017	1.3807
2018	1,3491
2019	1.3642
2020	1.3792
2021	1.344
2022	1.3789
2023	1.3431

== See also ==
- List of companies of Singapore
- List of largest companies in Singapore
- List of companies listed on the Singapore Exchange
- List of Singaporeans by net worth
- Corruption in Singapore
- Four Asian Tigers
- 5 C's of Singapore
- Bamboo network
- Dual economy
- Economic Development Board
- Enterprise Singapore
- Immigrant workers in Singapore
- Indonesia–Malaysia–Singapore growth triangle
- Singapore Workplace Safety and Health Conference
- Singapore Exchange
- Straits Times Index
- Singapore and the World Bank
