= Economic statistics of Singapore =

Economy of Singapore

This article contains economic statistics of the country Singapore. The GDP, GDP Per Capita, GNI Per Capita, Total Trade, Total Imports, Total Exports, Foreign Reserves, Current Account Balance, Average Exchange Rate, Operating Revenue and Total Expenditure are mentioned in the table below for years 1965 through 2018.

== 1965 to 2014 ==
Economy Statistics Since Year 1965 To Year 2014
Year	GDP (Billion)	GDP Per Capita	GNI (Billion)	GNI Per Capita	Total Trade (Billion)	Total Imports (Billion)	Total Exports (Billion)	Foreign Reserves (Billion)	Current Account Balance (Billion)	Average Exchange Rate US$ to S$	Operating Revenue (Billion)	Total Expenditure (Billion)
2014	S$390.089	S$71,318	S$378.329	S$69,168	S$982.701	S$463.779	S$518.922	S$340.438	S$74.466	S$1.2671	S$59.995	S$56.648
2013	S$378.200	S$70,047	S$366.618	S$67,902	S$980.153	S$466.762	S$513.391	S$344.729	S$67.674	S$1.2513	S$57.020	S$51.727
2012	S$362.332	S$68,205	S$351.765	S$66,216	S$984.883	S$474.554	S$510.329	S$316.744	S$62.200	S$1.2498	S$55.814	S$49.003
2011	S$346.353	S$66,816	S$338.452	S$65,292	S$974.396	S$459.655	S$514.741	S$308.403	S$76.172	S$1.2573	S$51.077	S$46.563
2010	S$322.361	S$63,498	S$320.526	S$63,137	S$902.062	S$423.221	S$478.840	S$288.954	S$76.278	S$1.3635	S$46.060	S$45,338
2009	S$279.858	S$56,111	S$266.889	S$53,511	S$747.417	S$356.299	S$391.118	S$263.955	S$47.068	S$1.4545	S$39.546	S$41.890
2008	S$271.980	S$56,201	S$259.712	S$53,666	S$927.654	S$450.892	S$478.840	S$250.346	S$39.251	S$1.4148	S$41.086	S$38.090
2005	S$212.074	S$49,715	S$198.050	S$46,428	—	—	—	S$192.813	S$46.382	S$1.6646	S$28.116	S$28.781
2000	S$165.217	S$41,018	S$164.205	S$40,767	—	—	—	S$138.927	S$17.511	S$1.7239	S$33.527	S$28.015
1995	S$124.575	S$35,346	S$125.475	S$35,601	—	—	—	S$97.330	S$20.434	S$1.4174	S$24.782	S$15.505
1990	S$70.507	S$23,139	S$69.798	S$22,907	—	—	—	S$48.478	S$5.614	S$1.8125	S$13.102	S$11.280
1985	S$40.823	S$14,921	S$41.161	S$15,045	—	—	—	S$27.070	S$1.274	S$2.2001	—	—
1980	S$25.863	S$10,714	S$24.536	S$10,165	—	—	—	S$13.757	S$-3.376	S$2.1413	—	—
1975	S$13.728	S$6,067	S$13.851	S$6,122	—	—	—	S$7.486	—	S$2.3713	—	—
1970	S$5.876	S$2,832	S$5.932	S$2,860	—	—	—	S$5.358	—	S$3.0620	—	—
1965	S$2.982	S$1,580	S$3.078	S$1,631	—	—	—	—	—	—	—	—
Using 2014 Market Prices

== 2014 to 2018 ==
Economic statistics: 2014 to 2018 Sources:
Year	GDP nominal (billion)	GDP nominal per capita	GDP real (billion)	GNI nominal (billion)	GNI nominal per capita	Foreign reserves (billion)	Average exchange rate (1US$ to S$)
2014	S$398.987	S$72,937	S$411.540	S$385,070	S$70,400	S$340.438	S$1.2671
2015	S$423.444	S$76,502	S$423.444	S$394.551	S$71,283	S$350.991	S$1.3748
2016	S$439.412	S$78,364	S$435.988	S$408.820	S$72,909	S$356.254	S$1.3815
2017	S$467.306	S$83,265	S$452.119	S$434.806	S$77,474	S$373.994	S$1.3807
2018	S$491.174	S$87,108	S$466.313	S$457.983	S$81,222	S$392.096	S$1.3491

== See also ==
- Economy of Singapore
