= TBP =

TBP is an abbreviation for:

- Cap. FAP Pedro Canga Rodríguez Airport, Tumbes, Peru, IATA code
- Tau Beta Pi, the national engineering honor society
- Three body problem, a problem in physics
  - The Three-Body Problem, a novel by Liu Cixin
- Time-Bound Programmes for the Eradication of the Worst forms of Child Labour, of the International Labor Organization
- Tiong Bahru Plaza, a shopping mall in Singapore
- The Brexit Party, British political party
- Tuas Biomedical Park, a biomedical manufacturing cluster in Tuas, Singapore
- To be provided, a placeholder variation of To be announced
- The Black Parade, an album by American rock band My Chemical Romance
- Unity Party (Turkey) (Türkiye Birlik Partisi)

== Chemistry ==
- TATA binding protein, a transcription factor
- Testosterone-binding protein, a glycoprotein
- 2,4,6-Tribromophenol, a chemical compound
- Tributyl phosphate, a solvent
