= Aquaculture in Singapore =

Aquaculture in Singapore is dominated by ornamental fish culture, followed by marine food fish culture. Known as "the capital of the ornamental fish industry", Singapore had brought in $76.7 million in 2019 and have traded with more than 80 countries. On the other hand, marine food fish culture only made up 10% of Singapore’s consumption of local fishes.

While majority of food fish culture today in Singapore are marine fish culture, before the 1980s, they consisted mainly of freshwater species. Most of these fishes consisted of carp, tilapia, and catfishes.

== Overview ==
Historically, aquaculture in Singapore was dominated and brought over by immigrant Chinese communities in the early colonial period (1900s-1920s), though Malay communities were also involved in aquaculture. Aquaculture were often shallow fish ponds, where fish farmers would actively bring in fish fry from abroad to grow in these ponds before marketable size. While carp fishes dominated this type of aquaculture, fish farmers eventually branch out into growing other fishes after Japanese Occupation. These fishes included tilapia and ornamental fishes.

Before the late 1960s, Singapore aquaculture was largely catered towards providing food supplies to Singapore residents or overseas consumers. However, ornamental fish culture boomed in the late 1967 where it raked in $2.5 million in income, earning attention from the Singapore government, who sought to boost the industry by encouraging fish farmers to grow ornamental fishes. Singapore grew a wide variety of ornamental fishes that were both freshwater and saltwater species, though the top five species continued to be goldfish, koi, mollies, platys, guppies.

However, many ornamental fish species were foreign species imported from neighbouring countries, which have consequences for Singapore's ecology. In a 1997 report, Ng and Lim recorded 52 foreign species in Singapore’s waterways, where 17 had a considerable population. This is in comparison with 35 domestic species existing in that time. In the latest 2020 report, the number increased to 123 foreign species in Singapore. It is not clear if these foreign species had negatively affected native species, but they posed an increasing risk with the growing ornamental fish industry.

== Freshwater fish culture ==
=== Chinese Carp ===
Chinese carp is a generic term in Singapore to describe a wider range of carp species reared by Chinese communities, which included grass carp (Ctenopharyngodan idellus), silver carp (Hypophthalmichthys molitrix), mud carp (Cirrhina molitorella) and bighead carp (Aristichthys nobilis).

Chinese carps are highly valued among Chinese communities historically. In the early colonial period (1900s-1930s), Chinese carp held high market value in Singapore and Malaya's market, driving the aquaculture of it. As Chinese carps are temperate fishes and not native to Singapore, they could not spawn in Singapore's tropical environment. Due to this, fish farmers had to constantly get fish fry from China, which were then placed into fish ponds to grow till sellable size. It usually takes up to four months for a carp fish to be ready for sale.

Chinese carps were easy to rear, as they could feed on the abundance of pond algae that were produced from pig and human excrements. However, this also meant that carp fish culture was largely limited to Chinese fish farmers, as Malay fish farmers had religious restrictions around the use of pig excrement. Due to this use of pig excrement, carp fishes were also disdained by colonial officials, and were only consumed largely by the Chinese communities.

However, this changed in 1932. To encourage the consumption of carp outside of the Chinese communities, the Malayan Fisheries Department sought to find alternative ways to grow carp. After many experiments, they successfully bred carp on “elephant and guinea grasses”. This also allowed Malay communities to breed carp fishes. With the greater number of sellers in the local market, this made carp a "cheap" fish in local markets by 1939.

During the Japanese Occupation, Singapore fish farmers were unable to grow carp fishes due to the restrictions on trade with China. However, the rearing of carp continued after the Japanese Occupation with the restoration of trade with China.

=== Tilapia ===
Known for its adaptability to tropical conditions, tilapia is a freshwater species brought in by the Japanese regime from Indonesia during the Japanese Occupation. For the purpose of addressing the lack of food supplies in Singapore and promote its "Grow more food" campaign, the Japanese regime brought tilapia into Singapore in 1944, where they first reared them in Tesui pond. After successful rearing experiments, the Japanese regime opened it to the public for rearing in 1945.

In the year 1945, tilapia grew in more than forty ponds in Singapore, mostly owned by Malay fish farmers. Although Chinese fish farmers sought to rear them due to the disruption in the trade of fish fry from China, they often had difficulty in getting permits from the Japanese administration to do it. Due to the late introduction into Singapore's local market, tilapia never became established in Singapore's local food fish market.

However, local demand for Tilapia reduced drastically after the Japanese Occupation with the re-entry of carp and other sea fishes into the local market. Despite so, the Malayan Fisheries Department, seeing the potential in tilapia in addressing the growing population's food needs, sought to improve the local demand for tilapia by removing the “earthy taste” of the fish that local people in Singapore disliked. They did this by rearing tilapia in brackish fish ponds. While they succeeded in rearing bigger tilapia in greater quantity, tilapia never managed to establish itself in the local market as a food fish. Instead, tilapia found itself in the regional market, where fish farmers continued to rear Tilapia and exported it to countries such as Taiwan, West Indies and those in the Pacific region.

=== Support and Decline of freshwater food fish culture ===
The Singapore government after Singapore's independence in 1965 had carried out land reclamation projects to build fish ponds, in order to maintain Singapore as a self-sufficient nation in food supplies. Before 1984, this was Singapore's main agriculture policy.

However, in 1984, Goh Keng Swee became the Director of the Primary Production Department, and he chose to phase out rural farms in favour of high-tech farming that churn out highly profitable products over products catered to domestic needs. Many of these farms that engaged in freshwater fish culture were also phased out. With this growing limited land for freshwater fish culture in Singapore, Singapore shifted towards marine fish culture for food production, as they take up less land.

== Marine Fish Culture ==
Marine fish culture by the coast only became prominent in the 1970s, through the efforts and experimentation of the Primary Production Department. Towards the aim of producing high-value fishes, marine fish culture often included the rearing of fishes such as snappers, groupers and Asian sea bass among many other minor species. Grown in cage nets by the coasts, they were usually reared on trash fishes and sold to high-end restaurants for profit.

In 1981, 32 farms were active, and its revenue was worth around $4 million. In 1991, fish farms increased to 77 and their revenue increased to $13.2 million. These farms were located in Serangoon/Loyang, Pulau Ubin, Ponggol and Lim Chu Kang, on the Straits of Johore.

== Brackish Fish Culture ==
=== Prawn ===
Prawn farming was also brought over by Chinese communities in the early 1900s. Prawns would be caught from the sea during high tides and enclosed in the mangrove swamps, where they would be raised till sellable size. Aside from being caught from the sea, fish farmers would also purchase prawn fry to cultivate them in their brackish ponds. They are often fed with trash fish to grow. In the early 1970s, the Primary Production Department experimented with cultivating giant freshwater prawns due to its high market value, which could be grown in both freshwater and brackish conditions.

However, land reclamation in Singapore had taken over majority of mangrove forests, making this traditional form of prawn farming mostly gone as an industry.

== Ornamental Fish Culture ==
Singapore's aquaculture industry is dominated by ornamental fish industry. Due to Singapore's tropical environment, Singapore was able to capitalize on it and breed tropical fishes for the global market. While ornamental fish culture existed as early as 1950s, it only came into prominence in the late 1960s. In 1967, it brought high income exceeding $2.5 million and was exporting to over 30 countries.

Aware of the industry's high income, the Primary Production Department played a crucial role in encouraging fish farmers to convert to rearing ornamental fishes. They also encouraged fish hobbyists to rear them in HDB flats. Furthermore, the Primary Production Department also invested in R&D to improve the techniques and methods of breeding ornamental fishes. In 1977, the industry’s revenue hit $25 million. By 1986, this reached a high point of $50 million.

While ornamental fish culture initially started in traditional fish ponds, they progressively moved into “industrial space units”, with specialized filtration water systems that allowed more fishes to grow in smaller amount of land. To reduce manpower, fish farmers also moved towards using automated machines to increase the efficiency of fish culture activities.

In 2003, the Ornamental Fish Business Cluster (OFBS) was formed to facilitate greater cooperation between public and private sectors to make Singapore “an ornamental fish export hub”. In 2014, ornamental fish industry reached a whopping US$69.2 million and made up to about 20% of the global trade of ornamental fish. In 2018, there were “125 ornamental fish farms in operation”. They are in Lim Chu Kang and rural Sungei Tengah areas.

=== Pressure to sign CITES Regulation ===
Before 1986, Singapore was the only country in Southeast Asia region that had not signed the CITES agreement, which was an international agreement between countries to regulate wildlife trade in order to ensure endangered species were not threatened.

Singapore had a bad reputation for being a "notorious" port that allowed and facilitated illegal wildlife trade and smuggling. Even though CITES secretariat attempted to convince Singapore to sign the CITES agreement in the early 1980s, Singapore constantly delayed the decision to sign the agreement until America ban the importation of ornamental fish products and wildlife imports from Singapore in 1986. America justified the ban on Singapore’s lack of documentation on the origins of these fish imports. Because the United States made up 40% of Singapore's ornamental fish trade, the ban would be seriously detrimental to Singapore's ornamental fish industry.

In response to this ban, Singapore moved towards signing the CITES agreement three days before the ban. However, while the US lifted the ban on ornamental fish, US continued to enforce a ban on wildlife imports from Singapore to ensure Singapore would adhere to its demands on wildlife regulations. Singapore adhered to its demands and in 1987, America lifted the ban on wildlife imports from Singapore.

CITES regulation continued to be relevant in Singapore's management and regulation of ornamental fish industry. For example, Dragon fish, which is regarded as an endangered fish species, requires CITES licenses and permits for a farm to breed them and export them for sale. People who reared dragon fish also needed to keep recorded data on their sale statistics and breeding practices for authorities.

== Production Values ==
These are statistics of production for both marine aquaculture and ornamental fish aquaculture, from 2015-2023.

Aquaculture Production of Seafood
Year	Local Production Of Seafood (Tonnes)
2015	6432
2016	5597
2017	5390
2018	5192
2019	5335
2020	4567
2021	5069
2022	4440
2023	4090

Aquaculture Production of Ornamental fish
Year	Local Production Of Aquarium Fish (Million Pieces)
2015	77
2016	77
2017	73
2018	78
2019	85
2020	69
2021	66
2022	41
2023	49

== Aquaculture Now and Future ==
Singapore has continued to invest into R&D, where various organizations such as National University of Singapore, Nanyang Technological University, Temasek Life Sciences Laboratory and Agri-Food & Veterinary Authority of Singapore were involved in developing more high and efficient technology that would improve the production of aquaculture.

While Singapore has a substantial aquaculture industry, Singapore is shifting towards being an "aquaculture R&D hub" rather than a major producer of food fish. Rather than producing food fish within its borders, Singapore develop aquaculture technology within its borders, while producing fishes in other countries.

There are a couple of Singapore-based companies that are moving towards the aquaculture of fishes in other countries. Barramundi Asia has Barramundi farms in Australia and Singapore. Oceanus has been growing abalones in China. Qianhu fish farm also grow food fishes such as groupers, coral trout and shrimps in China.
