= Singapore Workplace Safety and Health Conference =

Annual workplace safety and health conference in Singapore

The Singapore Workplace Safety and Health Conference (SWSHC) is a biennial conference for the promotion of workplace safety and health (WSH, OH&S) thought and practice in Singapore and the region.

Organised by the Workplace Safety & Health Council (WSH Council) in partnership with Singapore’s Ministry of Manpower, the conference aims to bring together regulators, industry leaders and safety professionals to identify problems, formulate recommendations and develop and implement best practices to ensure the improvement and advancement of safety standards in the workplace.

== Embracing Challenges, Pushing WSH Frontiers ==
The inaugural conference will be held on 15 to 16 September 2010 at Suntec Singapore International Convention and Exhibition Centre.

The theme for the two-day conference, "Embracing Challenges, Pushing WSH Frontiers", is aimed at creating awareness for the legal, moral and economic reasons behind WSH legislation, changing opinions of WSH practices, and creating a framework for the sustained promotion of WSH thought.

Speakers at the 2010 conference include local and international WSH thought leaders and Captains of Industry, including Professor Harri Vainio from the Finnish Institute of Occupational Health, Mr. John Spanswick from the United Kingdom’s Health and Safety Executive Board and Mr. Choo Chiau Beng, CEO of Keppel Corporation.
