= Temasek Life Sciences Laboratory =

Research organization in Singapore

- Established: August 2002
- Affiliations: National University of Singapore; Nanyang Technological University
- Location: 1, Research Link, National University of Singapore Singapore 117604, Singapore; 1.2943°N 103.7747°E
- Website: www.tll.org.sg

Temasek Life Sciences Laboratory (TLL) was established in August 2002 as a Singapore Non Profit Philanthropic Research Organisation focusing primarily on understanding the cellular mechanisms that underlie the development and physiology of plants, fungi and animals which provides foundation for biotechnology innovation.

It is affiliated with the National University of Singapore and the Nanyang Technological University and is located within the campus of the National University of Singapore.

TLL has 230 researchers from about 20 different nationalities to engage in biomolecular science research and applications.

== History ==
Founded in 2002, Temasek Life Sciences Laboratory (TLL) is a beneficiary of Temasek Trust which oversees the initial endowment of S$500 million by Temasek to support corporate social responsibility philanthropic efforts in developing and delivering community programmes.

== Academic Programmes ==
1. PhD / Graduate Programme

2. Internship Programme

3. Research Attachment Programme (REAP)

The Research Attachment Programme (REAP) is jointly organised with the Ministry of Education (MOE), National University of Singapore (NUS) to cultivate local life sciences research talents.

The eight-week programme is designed for first-year Biology and Chemistry students in local junior colleges (JCs) to encourage them to pursue a career in life sciences by stimulating their interest with hands-on training in research environment and interactions with professional scientists.

4. Undergraduate Programme (UTP)

The Undergraduate Programme (UTP) promotes scientific exchange and research collaboration between TLL and top-tier Chinese and Indian universities, where final year undergraduates are given the opportunity to undertake research projects at TLL for 3 to 4 months.

5. Graduate Attachment Programme (GAP)

The Graduate Attachment Programme (GAP), which lasts for 3 to 6 months, exposes local fresh graduates to the R&D environment to encourage them to pursue a career in research.

6. Other Training

TLL also participates in the attachment programmes offered by Nanyang Polytechnic, Ngee Ann Polytechnic, Republic Polytechnic, Singapore Polytechnic, and Temasek Polytechnic.

== Publications ==
Since its inception, TLL has made over 60 inventions and published over 730 papers in peer-reviewed journals, of which more than 25 percent are in high impact research journals such as Nature.

In 2011, TLL published 59 papers in peer-reviewed journals and made five discoveries including the specific Enterovirus 711 monoclonal antibodies which can be further developed as potential therapeutics.

In 2012, TLL published 85 papers in peer-reviewed journals and made 11 discoveries, out of which five have been licensed.

== Research overview ==
Under the PhD / Graduate Programme, TLL supervised 90 PhD candidates with their thesis research being carried out in various laboratories within TLL.

The research efforts aim to address both the immediate and long-term needs of the life sciences industry with a particular focus on cell biology, developmental biology, genomes structural biology and molecular pathogenesis.

One third of TLL’s research programmes is directed at practical research such as improving non-food biofuel sources and developing rapid diagnostic test kits, therapeutics and vaccines for emerging infectious diseases such as the H5N1 bird flu virus.
