= Tuas Biomedical Park =

Industrial park in Singapore

Coordinates: 01°17′31.9″N 103°37′51.7″E

Tuas Biomedical Park (abbreviation: TBP) is a biomedical manufacturing cluster developed by JTC Corporation at the western end of Singapore. The 183-hectare Tuas Biomedical Park I and 188-hectare Tuas Biomedical Park II are located at Tuas View – 20 minutes away from Jurong Port and five minutes from the Tuas Checkpoint to Malaysia.

TBP comes with all essential infrastructure, such as roads, power lines, telecommunication lines, sewer pipes and water and gas supplies. Third parties are providing utilities such as steam, natural gas, chilled water and waste treatment services.

To improve the appearance of the industrial estate, JTC has spent $6 million on lush landscaping.

With the estate's "plug-and-play" design, pharmaceutical, biologics, medical device and other biomedical companies can set up manufacturing operations with minimal lead time. They can either move into fully serviced facilities or custom-build their own manufacturing plants.

Currently, there are many well-known companies operating in TBP. They include global biomedical players like Merck, Novartis, Pfizer, Wyeth, Genentech and GlaxoSmithKline.
