= Cultural dissimilation =

Rejection of features of another culture

Cultural dissimilation is the process in which a minority group or culture comes to unresemble a society's majority group or fully rejects the values, behaviors, and beliefs of another group. The melting pot model is fundamentally opposed to this concept. A related term is "cultural segregation", which describes the process of becoming economically and socially segregated from another society while retaining elements of one's former culture. Cultural dissimilation is opposed to multiculturalism (or a "cultural mosaic"), as dissimilation involves a minority group rejecting the dominant culture, while multiculturalism promotes the coexistence and preservation of multiple cultures. Other closely related concepts are dissociation from American scholar Eric Mark Kramer's theory of Dimensional Accrual and Dissociation (DAD) and separation from the fourfold model of acculturation. Though anthropologists have more often used antonym of dissimilation, assimilation, in literature regarding minorities, several others have made the term the crux of their research.

== Cultural dissimulation ==
A phenomenon similar to it due to being a false cultural assimilation, "[cultural] dissimulation", meaning one entity pretending to be another, is recognized by academic literature as an effective coping strategy which does not warrant being reduced to negative connotations, e.g., in the case of the Islamic concept of taqiyya at the behest of "[s]ome less than scholarly policy-oriented studies", instead "show[ing] the robustness of intergroup differences". It is argued by American anthropologist Hande Sözer to be more specifically characterized as a "social mechanism involving similarity in opposition".

== Perspective of dominant culture ==
There has been little to no existing research or evidence that demonstrates whether and how immigrant's mobility gains—assimilating to a dominant country such as language ability, socioeconomic status etc.— causes changes in the perception of those who were born in the dominant country. This essential type of research provides information on how immigrants are accepted into dominant countries. In an article by Ariela Schachter, titled "From "different" to "similar": an experimental approach to understanding assimilation", a survey was taken of white American citizens to view their perception of immigrants who now resided in the United States. The survey indicated the whites tolerated immigrants in their home country. White natives are open to having "structural" relation with the immigrants-origin individuals, for instance, friends and neighbors; however, this was with the exception of black immigrants and natives and undocumented immigrants. However, at the same time, white Americans viewed all non-white Americans, regardless of legal status, as dissimilar.

A similar journal by Jens Hainmueller and Daniel J. Hopkins titled "The Hidden American Immigration Consensus: A Conjoint Analysis of Attitudes toward Immigrants" confirmed similar attitudes towards immigrants. The researchers used an experiment to reach their goal which was to test nine theoretical relevant attributes of hypothetical immigrants. Asking a population-based sample of U.S. citizens to decide between pairs of immigrants applying for admission to the United States, the U.S. citizen would see an application with information for two immigrants including notes about their education status, country, origin, and other attributes. The results showed Americans viewed educated immigrants in high-status jobs favourably, whereas they view the following groups unfavourably: those who lack plans to work, those who entered without authorization, those who are not fluent in English and those of Iraqi descent.

== See also ==
- Acculturation
- Code-switching
- Conformity
- Cultural agility
- Cultural amalgamation
- Cultural appropriation
- Cultural genocide
- Cultural bereavement
- Cultural imperialism
- Cultural loss
- Deindividuation
- Diaspora politics
- Durham Report
- Enculturation
- Ethnic interest group
- Ethnic relations
- Ethnocide
- Ethnopluralism
- Forced assimilation
- Forced conversion
- Globalization
- Hegemony
- Immigrant-host model
- Immigration and crime
- Indigenization
- Intercultural communication
- Intercultural competence
- Language death
- Language shift
- Leitkultur
- Mankurt
- Melting Pot
- Nationalism
- Orientalism
- Parallel society
- Patriotism
- Political correctness
- Racial integration
- Racial segregation
- Recuperation (politics)
- Religious assimilation
- Religious segregation
- Respectability politics
- Social integration
- Sociology of race and ethnic relations
- Sovietization
- Taqiyya

Culture-specific:

- De-Arabization
- De-Russification
- De-Sanskritisation
- De-Sinicization
- Stolen Generations (of Australian Aboriginals)

== Bibliography ==
- Alba, Richard D.; Nee, Victor (2003). Remaking the American Mainstream. Assimilation and Contemporary Immigration. Harvard University Press. ISBN 978-0-674-01813-6.
- Armitage, Andrew (1995). Comparing the Policy of Aboriginal Assimilation: Australia, Canada, and New Zealand. UBC Press. ISBN 978-0-7748-0459-2.
- Crispino, James A. (1980). The Assimilation of Ethnic Groups: The Italian Case. Center for Migration Studies. ISBN 978-0-913256-39-8.
- Drachsler, Julius (1920). Democracy and Assimilation: The Blending of Immigrant Heritages in America. Macmillan.
- Gordon, Milton M. Daedalus Yetman (ed.). "Assimilation in America: Theory and Reality". Journal of the American Academy of Arts and Sciences. 90 (2). Boston, Mass.: 245–258.
- Gordon, Milton M. (1964). Assimilation in American Life: The Role of Race, Religion, and National Origins. New York: Oxford University Press.
- Grauman, Robert A. (1951). Methods of studying the cultural assimilation of immigrants. University of London.
- Kazal, R. A. (April 1995). "Revisiting Assimilation". American Historical Society. 100.
- Kramer, Eric Mark (1988). Television criticism and the problem of ground interpretation after deconstruction (Thesis). Ann Arbor: University of Michigan.
- Kramer, Eric Mark (1992). Consciousness and culture: an introduction to the thought of Jean Gebser (PDF). Contributions in sociology. Westport, Conn: Greenwood Press. pp. 1–60. ISBN 978-0-313-27860-0. Archived from the original (PDF) on 2012-04-26.
- Kramer, Eric Mark (1997a). Modern/postmodern: Off the Beaten Path of Antimodernism. Westport, CT: Praeger. ISBN 978-0-275-95758-2.
- Kramer, Eric Mark (1997b). Postmodernism and Race. Westport, CT: Praeger.
- Kramer, Eric Mark (2000a). "Cultural fusion and the defense of difference" (PDF). In Asante, M. K.; Min, J. E. (eds.). Socio-cultural Conflict between African and Korean Americans. New York: University Press of America. pp. 182–223. Archived from the original (PDF) on 2012-04-26.
- Kramer, Eric Mark (2000b). "Contemptus mundi: Reality as disease" (PDF). In issues, V.; Murphy, J. W. (eds.). Computers, human interaction, and organizations: Critical issues. Westport, CT: Praeger. pp. 31–54. Archived from the original (PDF) on 2016-03-04.
- Kramer, Eric Mark (2003). The Emerging Monoculture: Assimilation and the "Model Minority". Westport, CT: Praeger. ISBN 978-0-275-97312-4.
- Kramer, Eric Mark (2009). "Theoretical reflections on intercultural studies: Preface" (PDF). In Croucher, S. (ed.). Looking Beyond the Hijab. Cresskill, NJ: Hampton. pp. ix–xxxix. Archived from the original (PDF) on 2016-03-04.
- Kramer, Eric Mark (2010). "Immigration" (PDF). In Jackson, II, R. L. (ed.). Encyclopedia of Identity. Thousand Oaks: Sage. pp. 384–389. Archived from the original (PDF) on 2012-04-26.
- Kramer, Eric Mark (2011). "Preface" (PDF). In Croucher, S. (ed.). Religious Misperceptions: The case of Muslims and Christians in France and Britain. Cresskill, NJ: Hampton. pp. vii–xxxii. Archived from the original (PDF) on 2012-04-26.
- Kramer, Eric Mark (2012). "Dimensional accrual and dissociation: An introduction". In Grace, J. (ed.). Comparative Cultures and Civilizations. Vol. 3. Cresskill, NJ: Hampton.
- Murguía, Edward (1975). Assimilation, Colonialism, and the Mexican American People. University of Texas at Austin: Center for Mexican American Studies. ISBN 978-0-292-77520-6.
- Zhou, Min (Winter 1997). "Segmented Assimilation: Issues, Controversies, and Recent Research on the New Second Generation". International Migration Review. 31 (4, Special Issue: Immigrant Adaptation and Native–Born Responses in the Making of Americans): 975–1008. doi:10.1177/019791839703100408. PMID 12293212. S2CID 20588618.
- Zhou, Min; Carl L. Bankston (1998). Growing Up American: How Vietnamese Children Adapt to Life in the United States. Vol. III. New York: Russell Sage Foundation. ISBN 978-0-87154-995-2.
