= Cultural assimilation =

Adoption of features of another culture

Cultural assimilation is the process in which a minority group or culture comes to resemble a society's majority group or fully adopts the values, behaviors, and beliefs of another group. The melting pot model is based on this concept. A related term is "cultural integration", which describes the process of becoming economically and socially integrated into another society while retaining elements of one's original culture. Cultural assimilation is opposed to multiculturalism (or a "cultural mosaic"), as assimilation involves a minority group adopting the dominant culture, while multiculturalism promotes the coexistence and preservation of multiple cultures. Another closely related concept is acculturation, which occurs through cultural diffusion and involves changes in the cultural patterns of one or both groups, while still maintaining distinct characteristics. Though anthropologists have less often used antonym of assimilation, dissimilation, in literature regarding minorities, several others have made the term the crux of their research.

There are various types of cultural assimilation, including full assimilation and forced assimilation. Full assimilation is common, as it occurs spontaneously. Assimilation can also involve what is called additive assimilation, in which individuals or groups expand their existing cultural repertoire rather than replacing their ancestral culture. This is an aspect it shares with acculturation as well. When used as a political ideology, assimilationism refers to governmental policies of deliberately assimilating ethnic groups into a national culture. It encompasses both voluntary and involuntary assimilation.

In both cultural assimilation and integration, majority groups may expect minority groups to outright adopt the everyday practices of the dominant culture by using the common language in conversations, following social norms, integrating economically and engaging in sociopolitical activities such as cultural participation, active advocacy and electoral and community participation. Various forms of exclusion, social isolation, and discrimination can hinder the progress of this process.

Cultural integration, which is mostly found in multicultural communities, resembles a type of sociocultural assimilation because, over time, the minority group or culture may assimilate into the dominant culture, and the defining characteristics of the minority culture may become less obverse or disappear for practical reasons. Hence, in certain sociopolitical climates, cultural integration could be conceptualized as similar to cultural assimilation, with the former considered merely as one of the latter's phases.

== Overview ==
Cultural assimilation may occur either quickly or gradually, depending on the circumstances of the group. Full assimilation takes place when members of a society are no longer distinguishable from those of the dominant group in that society.

Whether a group is expected to assimilate is often disputed by both members of the group and the dominant members of society. Cultural assimilation does not necessarily result in similarity of appearance. Geographical and other natural barriers between groups, even when influenced by a predominant culture, may lead to cultural differences. Cultural assimilation can happen either spontaneously or forcibly, the latter when more dominant cultures use various means aimed at forced assimilation.

Various types of assimilation, including forced cultural assimilation, are particularly relevant regarding Indigenous groups during colonialism taking place between the 18th, 19th, and 20th centuries. This type of assimilation included religious conversion, separation of families, changes of gender roles, division of property among foreign power, elimination of local economies, and lack of sustainable food supply. Whether via colonialism or within one nation, methods of forced assimilation are often unsustainable, leading to revolts and collapses of power to maintain control over cultural norms. Often, cultures that are forced into different cultural practices through forced cultural assimilation revert to their native practices and religions that differ from the forced cultural values of other dominant powers. In addition throughout history, voluntary assimilation is often in response to pressure from a more predominant culture, and conformity is a solution for people to remain in safety. An example of voluntary cultural assimilation would be during the Spanish Inquisition, when Jews and Muslims accepted the Roman Catholic Church as their religion, but meanwhile, many people still privately practised their traditional religions. That type of assimilation is used to convince a dominant power that a culture has peacefully assimilated yet often voluntary assimilation does not mean the group fully conforms to the accepted cultural beliefs.

The term "assimilation" is often used about not only indigenous groups but also immigrants settled in a new land. A new culture and new attitudes toward the original culture are obtained through contact and communication. Assimilation assumes that a relatively-tenuous culture gets to be united into one unified culture. That process happens through contact and accommodation between each culture. The current definition of assimilation is usually used to refer to immigrants, but in multiculturalism, cultural assimilation can happen all over the world and within varying social contexts and is not limited to specific areas.

== Immigrant assimilation ==
Social scientists rely on four primary benchmarks to assess immigrant assimilation: socioeconomic status, geographic distribution, second language attainment, and intermarriage. William A.V. Clark defines immigrant assimilation in the United States as "a way of understanding the social dynamics of American society and that it is the process that occurs spontaneously and often unintended in the course of interaction between majority and minority groups."

Studies have also noted the positive effects of immigrant assimilation. A study by Bleakley and Chin (2010) found that people who arrived in the US at or before the age of nine from non-English speaking countries tend to speak English at a similar level as those from English-speaking countries. Conversely, those who arrived after nine from non–English speaking countries have much lower speaking proficiency, which increases linearly with age at arrival. The study also noted sociocultural impacts, such as those with better English skills are less likely to be currently married, more likely to divorce, have fewer children, and have spouses closer to their age. Learning to speak English well is estimated to improve income by over 33 percent. A 2014 study done by Verkuyten found that immigrant children who adapt through integration or assimilation are received more positively by their peers than those who adapt through marginalization or separation.

== Perspective of dominant culture ==
There has been little to no existing research or evidence that demonstrates whether and how immigrant's mobility gains—assimilating to a dominant country such as language ability, socioeconomic status etc.— causes changes in the perception of those who were born in the dominant country. This essential type of research provides information on how immigrants are accepted into dominant countries. In an article by Ariela Schachter, titled "From "different" to "similar": an experimental approach to understanding assimilation", a survey was taken of white American citizens to view their perception of immigrants who now resided in the United States. The survey indicated the whites tolerated immigrants in their home country. White natives are open to having "structural" relation with the immigrants-origin individuals, for instance, friends and neighbors; however, this was with the exception of black immigrants and natives and undocumented immigrants. However, at the same time, white Americans viewed all non-white Americans, regardless of legal status, as dissimilar.

A similar journal by Jens Hainmueller and Daniel J. Hopkins titled "The Hidden American Immigration Consensus: A Conjoint Analysis of Attitudes toward Immigrants" confirmed similar attitudes towards immigrants. The researchers used an experiment to reach their goal which was to test nine theoretical relevant attributes of hypothetical immigrants. Asking a population-based sample of U.S. citizens to decide between pairs of immigrants applying for admission to the United States, the U.S. citizen would see an application with information for two immigrants including notes about their education status, country, origin, and other attributes. The results showed Americans viewed educated immigrants in high-status jobs favourably, whereas they view the following groups unfavourably: those who lack plans to work, those who entered without authorization, those who are not fluent in English and those of Iraqi descent.

== Adaptation to new country ==
As the number of international students entering the US has increased, so has the number of international students in US colleges and universities. The adaptation of these newcomers is important in cross-cultural research. In the study "Cross-Cultural Adaptation of International College Student in the United States" by Yikang Wang, the goal was to examine how the psychological and socio-cultural adaptation of international college students varied over time. The survey contained a sample of 169 international students attending a coeducational public university. The two subtypes of adaptation: psychological and socio-cultural were examined. Psychological adaptation refers to "feelings of well-being or satisfaction during cross-cultural transitions;" while socio-cultural refers to the ability to fit into the new culture. The results for both graduate and undergraduate students show both satisfaction and socio-cultural skills changed over time. Psychological adaptation had the most significant change for a student who has resided in the US for at least 24 months while socio-cultural adaptation steadily increased over time. It can be concluded that eventually over time, the minority group will shed some of their culture's characteristic when in a new country and incorporate new culture qualities. Also, it was confirmed that more time spent in a new country would result in becoming more accustomed to the dominant countries' characteristics.

Figure 2 demonstrates as the length of time resided in the United States increase—the dominant country, the life satisfaction and socio-cultural skill increase as well—positive correlation.

In turn, research by Caligiuri's group, published in 2020, shows that one semester of classroom experiential activities designed to foster international and domestic student social interaction serve to foster international students’ sense of belonging and social support.

In a study by Viola Angelini, "Life Satisfaction of Immigrant: Does cultural assimilation matter?", the theory of assimilation as having benefits for well-being. The goal of this study was to assess the difference between cultural assimilation and the subjective well-being of immigrants. The journal included a study that examined a "direct measure of assimilation with a host culture and immigrants' subjective well-being." Using data from the German Socio-Economic Panel, it was concluded that there was a positive correlation between cultural assimilation and an immigrant's life's satisfaction/wellbeing even after discarding factors such as employment status, wages, etc. "Life Satisfaction of Immigrant: Does cultural assimilation matter?" also confirms "association with life satisfaction is stronger for established immigrants than for recent ones." It was found that the more immigrants that identified with the German culture and who spoke the fluent national language—dominant country language, the more they reported to be satisfied with their lives. Life satisfaction rates were higher for those who had assimilated to the dominant country than those who had not assimilated since those who did incorporate the dominant language, religion, psychological aspects, etc.

== Non-indigenous assimilation ==
In the study "Examination of cultural shock, intercultural sensitivity and willingness to adopt" by Clare D’Souza, the study uses a diary method to analyze the data collected. The study involved students undergoing a study abroad tour. The results show that negative intercultural sensitivity is much greater in participants who experience culture shock. Those who experience culture shock have emotional expressions and responses of hostility, anger, negativity, anxiety, frustration, isolation, and regression. Also, for one who has traveled to the country before permanently moving, they would have predetermined beliefs about the culture and their status within the country. The emotional expression for this individual includes excitement, happiness, eagerness, and euphoria.

Another article titled "International Students from Melbourne Describing Their Cross-Cultural Transitions Experiences: Culture Shock, Social Interaction, and Friendship Development" by Nish Belford focuses on cultural shock. Belford interviewed international students to explore their experience after living and studying in Melbourne, Australia. The data collected were narratives from the students that focused on variables such as "cultural similarity, intercultural communication competence, intercultural friendship, and relational identity to influence their experiences."

=== United States ===
Between 1880 and 1920, the United States took in roughly 24 million immigrants. This increase in immigration can be attributed to many historical changes. The beginning of the 21st century has also marked a massive era of immigration, and sociologists are once again trying to make sense of the impacts that immigration has on society and the immigrants themselves.

Assimilation had various meanings in American sociology. Henry Pratt Fairchild associates American assimilation with Americanization or the "melting pot" theory. Some scholars also believed that assimilation and acculturation were synonymous. According to a common point of view, assimilation is a "process of interpretation and fusion" from another group or person. That may include memories, behaviors, and sentiments. By sharing their experiences and histories, they blend into the common cultural life. A related theory is structural pluralism, proposed by American sociologist Milton Gordon. It describes the American situation wherein, despite the cultural assimilation of ethnic groups into mainstream American society, they maintained structural separation. Gordon maintained that there is limited integration of the immigrants into American social institutions such as educational, occupational, political, and social cliques.

During the Colonial Period from 1607 to 1776, individuals immigrated to the British colonies on two very different paths—voluntary and forced migration. Those who migrated to the colonies on their own volition were drawn by the allure of cheap land, high wages, and the freedom of conscience in British North America. On the latter half, the largest population of displaced people to the colonies was African slaves. Slavery was different from the other forced migrations as, unlike in the case of convicts, there was no possibility of earning freedom, although some slaves were manumitted in the centuries before the American Civil War. The long history of immigration in the established gateways means that the place of immigrants in terms of class, racial, and ethnic hierarchies in the traditional gateways is more structured or established, but on the other hand, the new gateways do not have much immigration history and so the place of immigrants in terms of class, racial, and ethnic hierarchies are less defined, and immigrants may have more influence to define their position. Secondly, the size of the new gateways may influence immigrant assimilation. Having a smaller gateway may affect the level of racial segregation among immigrants and native-born people. Thirdly, the difference in institutional arrangements may influence immigrant assimilation. Unlike new gateways, traditional gateways have many institutions set up to help immigrants, such as legal aid, bureaus, and social organizations. Finally, Waters and Jimenez have only speculated that those differences may influence immigrant assimilation and the way researchers should assess immigrant assimilation.

Furthermore, the advancement and integration of immigrants into the United States has accounted for 29% of U.S. population growth since 2000. Recent arrival of immigrants to the United States has been examined closely over the last two decades. The results show the driving factors for immigration, including citizenship, homeownership, English language proficiency, job status, and earning a better income.

=== Canada ===
Canada's multicultural history dates back to the period European colonization from the 16th to 19th centuries, with waves of ethnic European emigration to the region. In the 20th century, Indian, Chinese, and Japanese were the largest immigrant groups.

==== 20th century–present: Shift from assimilation to integration ====
Canada remains one of the largest immigrant populations in the world. The 2016 census recorded 7.5 million documented immigrants, representing a fifth of the country's population. Focus has shifted from a rhetoric of cultural assimilation to cultural integration. In contrast to assimilationism, integration aims to preserve the roots of a minority society while still allowing for smooth coexistence with the dominant culture.

== Indigenous assimilation ==
=== Australia ===
Legislation applying the policy of "protection" over Aboriginal Australians (separating them from white society) was adopted in some states and territories of Australia when they were still colonies, before the federation of Australia: in the Victoria in 1867, Western Australia in 1886, and Queensland in 1897. After federation, New South Wales crafted their policy in 1909, South Australia and the Northern Territory (which was under the control and of South Australia at the time) in 1910–11. Mission stations missions and Government-run Aboriginal reserves were created, and Aboriginal people moved onto them. Legislation restricted their movement, prohibited alcohol use and regulated employment. The policies were reinforced in the first half of the 20th century (when it was realized that Aboriginal people would not die out or be fully absorbed in white society) such as in the provisions of the Welfare Ordinance 1953, in which Aboriginal people were made wards of the state. "Part-Aboriginal" (known as half-caste) children were forcibly removed from their parents in order to educate them in European ways; the girls were often trained to be domestic servants. The protectionist policies were discontinued, and assimilationist policies took over. These proposed that "full-blood" Indigenous Australians should be allowed to “die out”, while "half-castes" were encouraged to assimilate into the white community. Indigenous people were regarded as inferior to white people by these policies, and often experienced discrimination in the predominantly white towns after having to move to seek work.

Between 1910 and 1970, several generations of Indigenous children were removed from their parents, and have become known as the Stolen Generations. The policy has done lasting damage to individuals, family and Indigenous culture.

The New Deal for Aborigines announced in 1939 marked the end of official policies based around "biological absorption" or "elimination" of Indigenous peoples, replaced with cultural assimilation as a prerequisite for civil rights. The 1961 Native Welfare Conference in Canberra, Australian federal and state government ministers formulated an official definition of "assimilation" of Indigenous Australians for government contexts. The Menzies Government's Federal Territories Minister Paul Hasluck informed the House of Representatives in April 1961 that:

The policy of assimilation means in the view of all Australian governments that all aborigines and part-aborigines are expected eventually to attain the same manner of living as other Australians and to live as members of a single Australian community enjoying the same rights and privileges, accepting the same responsibilities, observing the same customs and influenced by the same beliefs, hopes and loyalties as other Australians. Thus, any special measures taken for aborigines and part-aborigines are regarded as temporary measures not based on colour but intended to meet their need for special care and assistance to protect them from any ill effects of sudden change and to assist them to make the transition from one stage to another in such a way as will be favourable to their future social, economic and political advancement.

After leading the successful 1967 referendum that removed discriminatory clauses of the Australian Constitution, Liberal Prime Minister Harold Holt explained his government's policy on assimilation thus:

The word 'assimilation' is often misunderstood. There is nothing mandatory or arbitrary about it and it does not mean inter-breeding with the avowed objective of eventually eliminating the Aboriginal physical features or Aboriginal culture. Assimilation means that the Aborigines can be similar to other citizens, not of course in looks, but with regard to all the privileges and responsibilities of citizenship.

— Prime Minister Harold Holt, Sept, 1967

Holt's successor John Gorton endorsed a policy of "advancement" of Aboriginal people by means of "the assimilation of Aboriginal Australians as fully effective members of a single Australian society", and applauded "efforts being made by the States to involve Aboriginals themselves in the administration of their own affairs and in the exercise of proper authority among their own people," promising to emulate them at a Federal level. He outlined his Government's position thus:

In other words, without destroying Aboriginal culture, we want to help our Aboriginals to become an integral part of the rest of the Australian people, and we want the Aboriginals themselves to have a voice in the pace at which this process occurs. We will measure policy proposals against this objective, and will wish to avoid measures which are likely to set Aboriginal citizens permanently apart from other Australians through having their development based upon separate or different standards [...] However, we recognise that... many Aboriginal Australians are subject to special handicaps which impede their advancement. We are ready, therefore, to support additional action designed to help Aboriginals overcome these handicaps in the transitional phase.

— Prime Minister John Gorton, 12 July 1968

Government policies of 'assimilation' fell out of favour in Australia from the 1970s, with campaigners such as Australia's first Aboriginal Senator Neville Bonner favouring policies of 'integration' and 'self determination', and the Whitlam Labor and Fraser Liberal Governments promoting Land Rights legislation.

=== Brazil ===
In January 2019, the newly elected Brazil President Jair Bolsonaro stripped the Indigenous Affairs Agency FUNAI of the responsibility to identify and demarcate Indigenous lands. He argued that those territories have very tiny isolated populations and proposed to integrate them into the larger Brazilian society. According to the Survival International, "Taking responsibility for Indigenous land demarcation away from FUNAI, the Indian affairs department, and giving it to the Agriculture Ministry is virtually a declaration of open warfare against Brazil's tribal peoples."

=== Canada 1800s–1996: Forced assimilation ===
During the 19th and 20th centuries, and continuing until 1996, when the last Canadian Indian residential school was closed, the Canadian government, aided by Christian Churches, began an assimilationist campaign to forcibly assimilate Indigenous peoples in Canada. The government consolidated power over Indigenous land through treaties and the use of force, eventually isolating most Indigenous peoples to reserves. Marriage practices and spiritual ceremonies were banned, and spiritual leaders were imprisoned. Additionally, the Canadian government instituted an extensive residential school system to assimilate children. Indigenous children were separated from their families and no longer permitted to express their culture at these new schools. They were not allowed to speak their language or practice their own traditions without receiving punishment. There were many cases of violence and sexual abuse committed by the Christian church. The Truth and Reconciliation Commission of Canada concluded that this effort amounted to cultural genocide. The schools actively worked to alienate children from their cultural roots. Students were prohibited from speaking their native languages, were regularly abused, and were arranged marriages by the government after their graduation. The explicit goal of the Canadian government, through the Catholic and Anglican churches, was to completely assimilate Indigenous peoples into broader Canadian society and destroy all traces of their native history.

=== Croatia and Transylvania ===
During Croatia's personal union with Hungary, ethnic Croatians were pressured to abandon their traditional customs in favor of adopting elements of Hungarian culture, such as Catholicism and the Latin alphabet. Because of this, elements of Hungarian culture were considered part of Croatian culture, and can still be seen in modern Croatian culture.

Throughout the Kingdom of Hungary, many citizens, primarily those who belonged to minority groups, were forced to convert to Catholicism. The forced conversion policy was harshest in Croatia and Transylvania, where civilians could be sent to prison for refusing to convert. Romanian cultural anthropologist Ioan Lupaș claims that between 1002, when Transylvania became part of the Kingdom of Hungary, to 1300, approximately 200,000 non-Hungarians living in Transylvania were jailed for resisting Catholic conversion, and about 50,000 of them died in prison.

=== Mexico and Peru ===
A major contributor to cultural assimilation in South America began during exploration and colonialism that often is thought by Bartolomé de Las Casas to begin in 1492 when Europeans began to explore the Atlantic in search of "the Indies", leading to the discovery of the Americas. Europe remained dominant over the Americas' Indigenous populations as resources such as labor, natural resources i.e. lumber, copper, gold, silver, and agricultural products flooded into Europe, yet these gains were one-sided, as Indigenous groups did not benefit from trade deals with colonial powers. In addition to this, colonial metropoles such as Portugal and Spain required that colonies in South America assimilate to European customs – such as following the Holy Roman Catholic Church, acceptance of Spanish or Portuguese over Indigenous languages and accepting European-style government.

Through forceful assimilationist policies, colonial powers such as Spain used methods of violence to assert cultural dominance over Indigenous populations. One example occurred in 1519 when the Spanish explorer Hernán Cortés reached Tenochtitlán – the original capital of the Aztec Empire in Mexico. After discovering that the Aztecs practiced human sacrifice, Cortés killed high-ranked Aztecs and held Moctezuma II, the Aztec ruler, captive. Shortly after, Cortés began creating alliances to resume power in Tenochtitlán and renamed it Mexico City. Without taking away power through murder and spread of infectious diseases the Spanish conquistadores (relatively small in number) would not have been able to take over Mexico and convert many people to Catholicism and slavery. While Spaniards influenced linguistic and religious cultural assimilation among Indigenous peoples in South America during colonialism, many Indigenous languages such as the Incan language Quechua are still used in places such as Peru to this day by at least 4 million people.

=== New Zealand ===
In the course of the colonization of New Zealand from the late-18th century onwards, assimilation of the indigenous Maori population to the culture of incoming European visitors and settlers at first occurred spontaneously. Genetic assimilation commenced early and continued – the 1961 New Zealand census classified only 62.2% of Māori as "full-blood Maoris". (Compare Pākehā Māori.) Linguistic assimilation also occurred early and ongoingly: European settler populations adopted and adapted Māori words, while European languages affected Māori vocabulary (and possibly phonology).

In the 19th century colonial governments de facto encouraged assimilationist policies; by the late-20th century, policies favored bicultural development. Māori readily and early adopted some aspects of European-borne material culture (metals, muskets, potatoes) relatively rapidly. Imported ideas – such as writing, Christianity, monarchy, sectarianism, everyday European-style clothing, or disapproval of slavery – spread more slowly. Later developments (socialism, anti-colonialist theory, New Age ideas) have proven more internationally mobile. One long-standing view presents Māori communalism as unassimilated with European-style individualism.

=== United States ===
A series of efforts were made by the United States to assimilate Native Americans into mainstream European–American culture between the years of 1790 and the 1960s. George Washington and Henry Knox were first to propose, in the American context, the cultural assimilation of Native Americans. They formulated a policy to encourage the so-called "civilizing process". With increased waves of immigration from Europe, there was growing public support for education to encourage a standard set of cultural values and practices to be held in common by the majority of citizens. Education was viewed as the primary method in the acculturation process for minorities.

== See also ==
- Acculturation
- Code-switching
- Conformity
- Cultural agility
- Cultural amalgamation
- Cultural appropriation
- Cultural genocide
- Cultural bereavement
- Cultural imperialism
- Cultural loss
- Deindividuation
- Diaspora politics
- Durham Report
- Enculturation
- Ethnic interest group
- Ethnic relations
- Ethnocide
- Forced assimilation
- Forced conversion
- Globalization
- Hegemony
- Immigrant-host model
- Immigration and crime
- Indigenization
- Intercultural communication
- Intercultural competence
- Language death
- Language shift
- Leitkultur
- Mankurt
- Melting Pot
- Nationalism
- Parallel society
- Patriotism
- Political correctness
- Racial integration
- Racial segregation
- Recuperation (politics)
- Religious assimilation
- Respectability politics
- Social integration
- Sociology of race and ethnic relations
- Sovietization

Culture-specific:

- Anglicisation
- Arabization
- Christianization
- Croatisation
- Francization
- Germanization
- Hellenization
- Hispanicization
- Indianisation
- Islamification
- Italianization
- Japanization
- Javanisation
- Jewish assimilation
- Lithuanization
- Magyarization
- Malayisation
- Norwegianization
- Pashtunization
- Persianization
- Polonization
- Russification
- Romanianization
- Romanization
- Sanskritisation
- Serbianisation
- Sinicization
- Slavicisation
- Slovakization
- Swedification
- Ukrainization
- Thaification
- Turkification
- Vietnamization (cultural)
- Gerim
- "More Irish than the Irish themselves"
- Stolen Generations (of Australian Aboriginals)

== Bibliography ==
- Alba, Richard D.; Nee, Victor (2003). Remaking the American Mainstream. Assimilation and Contemporary Immigration. Harvard University Press. ISBN 978-0-674-01813-6.
- Armitage, Andrew (1995). Comparing the Policy of Aboriginal Assimilation: Australia, Canada, and New Zealand. UBC Press. ISBN 978-0-7748-0459-2.
- Crispino, James A. (1980). The Assimilation of Ethnic Groups: The Italian Case. Center for Migration Studies. ISBN 978-0-913256-39-8.
- Drachsler, Julius (1920). Democracy and Assimilation: The Blending of Immigrant Heritages in America. Macmillan.
- Gordon, Milton M. Daedalus Yetman (ed.). "Assimilation in America: Theory and Reality". Journal of the American Academy of Arts and Sciences. 90 (2). Boston, Mass.: 245–258.
- Gordon, Milton M. (1964). Assimilation in American Life: The Role of Race, Religion, and National Origins. New York: Oxford University Press.
- Grauman, Robert A. (1951). Methods of studying the cultural assimilation of immigrants. University of London.
- Kazal, R. A. (April 1995). "Revisiting Assimilation". American Historical Society. 100.
- Murguía, Edward (1975). Assimilation, Colonialism, and the Mexican American People. University of Texas at Austin: Center for Mexican American Studies. ISBN 978-0-292-77520-6.
- Zhou, Min (Winter 1997). "Segmented Assimilation: Issues, Controversies, and Recent Research on the New Second Generation". International Migration Review. 31 (4, Special Issue: Immigrant Adaptation and Native–Born Responses in the Making of Americans): 975–1008. doi:10.1177/019791839703100408. PMID 12293212. S2CID 20588618.
- Zhou, Min; Carl L. Bankston (1998). Growing Up American: How Vietnamese Children Adapt to Life in the United States. Vol. III. New York: Russell Sage Foundation. ISBN 978-0-87154-995-2.
