= Dissimulation =

Dissimulation may refer to:

== Culture ==
- Cultural dissimulation, an effective coping strategy of a minority group to reject the attitudes and customs of the prevailing culture and customs which does not warrant being reduced to negative connotations
- Dissembling or lying
- Preference falsification

== Media ==
- Dissimulation (Hope for the Dying album), a 2011 album by Hope for the Dying
- Dissimulation (KSI album), a 2020 album by KSI
- Dissimulate (album), a 2002 death metal album by The Berzerker

== See also ==
- Dissimilation, in linguistics
