= Golden calf =

Idol in the Torah, the Bible, and the Quran

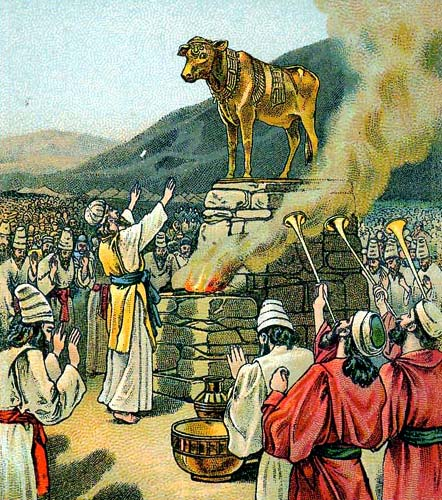
Worshiping the golden calf, as in Exodus 32:1-35, illustration from a Bible card published in 1901 by the Providence Lithograph Company

According to the Torah, the Bible, and the Quran, the golden calf (Hebrew: עֵגֶל הַזָּהָב, romanized: ʿēḡel hazzāhāḇ) or, in the Quranic account, the calf (Arabic: عِجْل, romanized: ʿijl) was a cult image made by the Israelites when Moses went up to Mount Sinai. In Hebrew, the incident is known as "the sin of the calf" (Hebrew: חֵטְא הָעֵגֶל, romanized: ḥēṭ hāʿēḡel). It is first mentioned in the Book of Exodus.

Bull worship was common in many cultures, and its religious iconography is found throughout the ancient Near East. In Egypt, whence according to the Exodus narrative, the Israelites had recently come, the bull-god Apis was a comparable object of worship, which some believe the Hebrews were reviving in the wilderness. While Egyptian deities like Hathor and Apis have been proposed, as well as the Mesopotamian Sin or Hadad—John Day and other scholars consider Yahweh, the national god of the Israelites, as being associated with or pictured as a sacred bull through the process of religious assimilation and syncretism. Furthermore, there is no tradition that names any other as Israel's deliverer, the festival is dedicated solely to their god, and Samaria Ostraca 41 has a personal name meaning 'calf of Yahweh' or 'Yahweh's calf', as well as the Kuntillet Ajrud inscriptions. Among the Canaanites, some of whom would become the Israelites, the bull was associated with Baal, and widely worshipped as the sacred bull and the creature of El in Ugaritic texts.

The accounts of golden calves in Exodus 32 and 1 Kings 12 are considered to be related with structural similarities, and around 13 parallels between the narratives.

== Biblical narrative ==
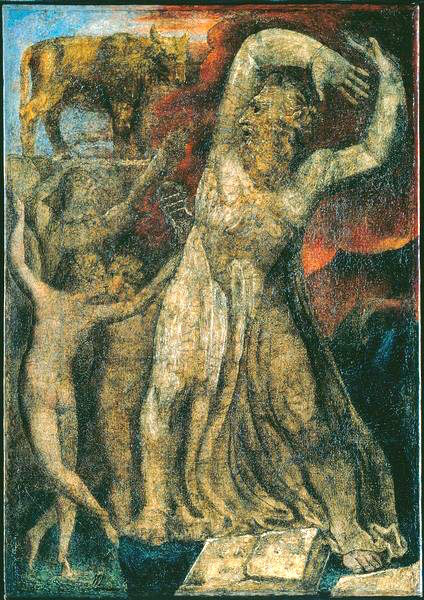
Moses Indignant at the Golden Calf, painting by William Blake, 1799–1800

When Moses went up Mount Sinai to receive the Ten Commandments (Exodus 24:12–18), he left the Israelites for forty days and nights. The Israelites feared that he would not return and demanded that Aaron make them "a god who shall go before us". Aaron told the Israelites' to bring their golden earrings and ornaments, constructed a golden calf and declared, "'This is your god, O Israel, who brought you out of the land of Egypt!'" (Exodus 32:1–4).

Aaron built an altar before the calf and proclaimed the next day to be a feast to yhwh. "Early next day, the people offered up burnt offerings and brought sacrifices of well-being; they sat down to eat and drink, and then rose to dance." (Exodus 32:6)

yhwh told Moses what the Israelites were up to back in camp, that they had turned aside quickly from the way which God commanded them and he was going to destroy them and start a new people from Moses. Moses pleaded that they should be spared "And yhwh renounced the punishment planned for God’s people." (Exodus 32:11–14)

Moses went down from the mountain; upon seeing the calf, he became angry and threw down the two Tablets of Stone, breaking them. Moses burnt the golden calf in a fire, ground it to powder, scattered it on water, and forced the Israelites to drink it. When Moses asked him, Aaron admitted to collecting the gold and throwing it into the fire; he said it came out as a calf. (Exodus 32:21–24)

=== Exclusion of the Levites and mass execution ===
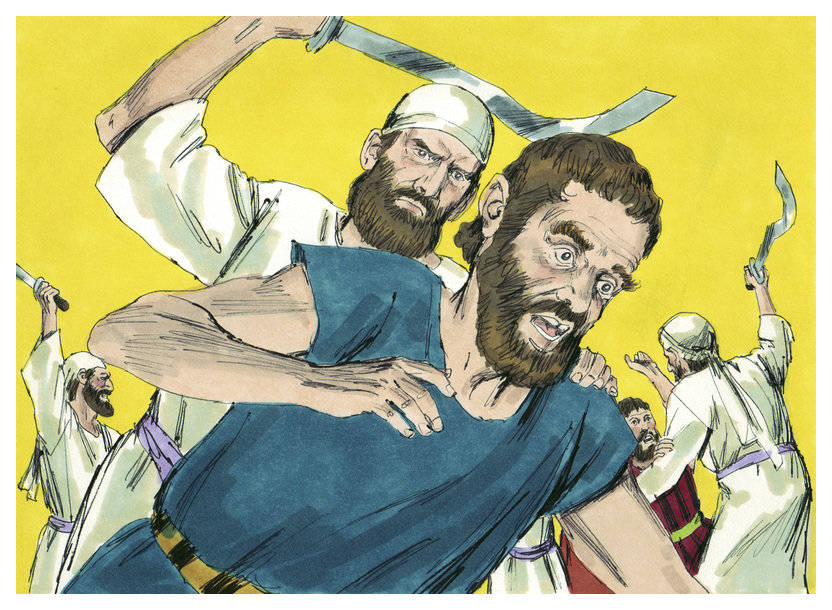
The Levites killed about 3,000 Israelites who worshipped the Golden Calf (1984 illustration by Jim Padgett).

The Bible records that the tribe of Levi did not worship the golden calf. Moses stood in the gate of the camp, and said, “Whoever is for YHWH, come here!” Then all the men of Levi rallied to him.

He said to them, "Thus says yhwh, the God of Israel: Each of you put sword on thigh, go back and forth from gate to gate throughout the camp, and slay sibling, neighbor, and kin." The men of Levi did as Moses had bidden; and some three thousand of the people fell that day. And Moses said, "Dedicate yourselves to yhwh this day—for each of you has been against blood relations—that [God] may bestow a blessing upon you today."

— Exodus 32:26–28

== Other mentions in the Bible ==
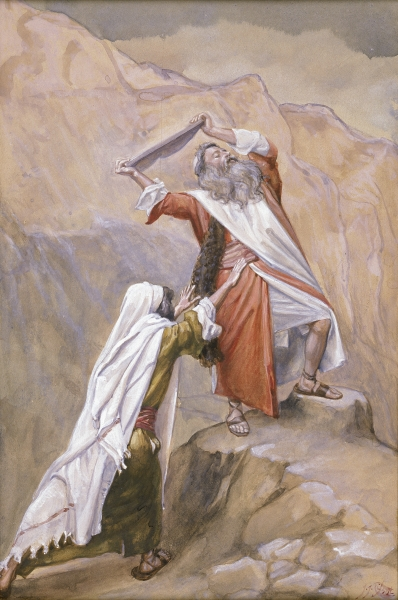
Moses destroying the tablets (watercolor c. 1896–1902 by James Tissot)

The golden calf is mentioned in Nehemiah 9:16–21.

But they, our ancestors, became arrogant and stiff-necked, and they did not obey your commands. They refused to listen and failed to remember the miracles you performed among them. They became stiff-necked and in their rebellion appointed a leader in order to return to their slavery. But you are a forgiving God, gracious and compassionate, slow to anger and abounding in love. Therefore you did not desert them, even when they cast for themselves an image of a calf and said, 'This is your god, who brought you up out of Egypt', or when they committed awful blasphemies. Because of your great compassion you did not abandon them in the wilderness. By day the pillar of cloud did not fail to guide them on their path, nor the pillar of fire by night to shine on the way they were to take. You gave your good Spirit to instruct them. You did not withhold your manna from their mouths, and you gave them water for their thirst. For forty years you sustained them in the wilderness; they lacked nothing, their clothes did not wear out nor did their feet become swollen.

The language suggests that there are some inconsistencies in the other accounts of the Israelites and their use of the calf. As the version in Exodus and 1 Kings are written by Deuteronomistic historians based in the southern Kingdom of Judah, there is a proclivity to expose the Israelites as unfaithful. The inconsistency is primarily located in Exodus 32:4 where "gods" is plural despite the construction of a single calf.

The episode of the golden calf is also mentioned in the New Testament, by the apostle Paul, in 1 Corinthians chapter 10, as a warning against idolatry. "Now these things occurred as examples to keep us from setting our hearts on evil things as they did. Do not be idolaters, as some of them were... ."

Scholars are divided on other intertextual references to the golden calf in the Torah, notably the ordeal of the bitter water in the Book of Numbers 5:17–24. Specific elements of the ritual, such as the powder mixed into water and being forced to drink, echo similar language in the aftermath of Moses punishing Israel at the end of the narrative. In Hosea 8 there is a condemnation against the "calf of Samaria" which was broken to pieces by the Assyrians.

== Jeroboam's golden calves at Bethel and Dan ==
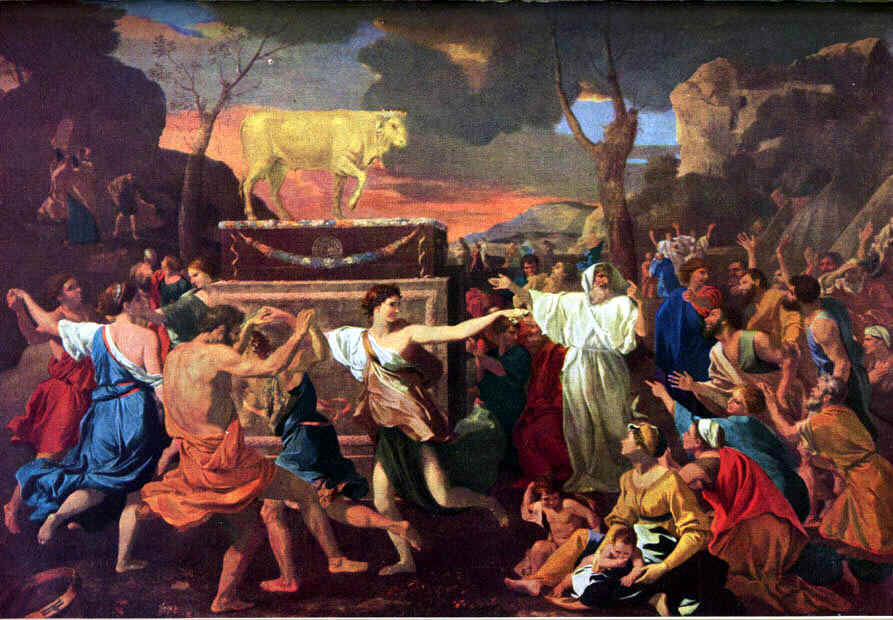
The Adoration of the Golden Calf by Nicolas Poussin

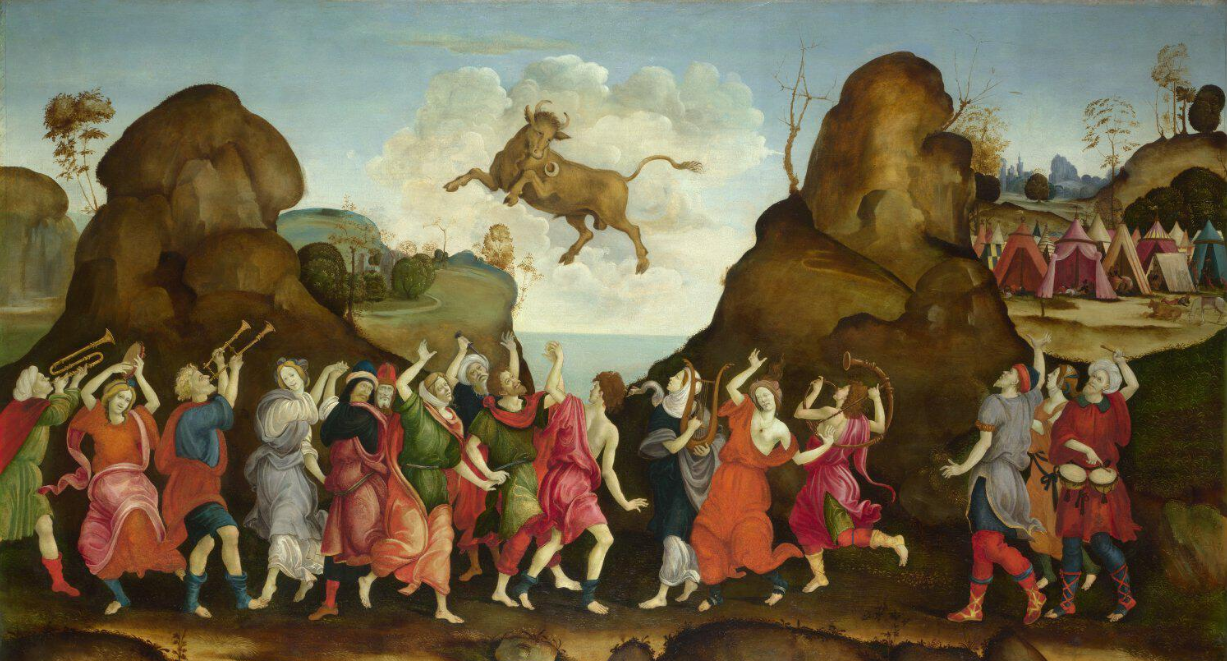
The Worship of the Golden Calf by Filippino Lippi (1457–1504)

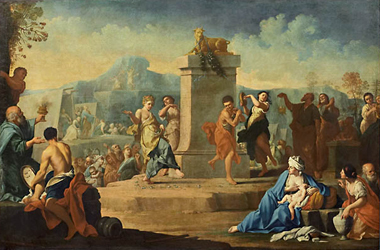
Dance around the Golden Calf by Giuseppe Gambarini (1680 – 11 September 1725)

According to 1 Kings 12:26–30, after Jeroboam establishes the northern Kingdom of Israel, he contemplates the sacrificial practices of the Israelites.

Jeroboam thought to himself, "The kingdom will now likely revert to the house of David. If these people go up to offer sacrifices at the temple of the LORD in Jerusalem, they will again give their allegiance to their lord, Rehoboam king of Judah. They will kill me and return to King Rehoboam." After seeking advice, the king made two golden calves. He said to the people, "It is too much for you to go up to Jerusalem. Here are your gods, Israel, who brought you up out of Egypt." One he set up in Bethel, and the other in Dan. And this thing became a sin; the people came to worship the one at Bethel and went as far as Dan to worship the other.

His concern was that the tendency to offer sacrifices in Jerusalem, which is in the southern Kingdom of Judah, would lead to a return to King Rehoboam. He makes two golden calves and places them in Bethel and Dan. He erects the two calves in what he figures (in some interpretations) as substitutes for the cherubim built by King Solomon in Jerusalem.

However, in the Antiquities of the Jews (v. VIII: 8), which is taken from the Septuagint, Josephus states: "He made two golden heifers, and built two little temples for them, the one in the city Bethel, and the other in Dan...and he put the heifers into both the little temples in the aforementioned cities."

Richard Elliott Friedman says "at a minimum we can say that the writer of the golden calf account in Exodus seems to have taken the words that were traditionally ascribed to Jeroboam and placed them in the mouths of the people." Friedman believes that the story was turned into a polemic, exaggerating the throne platform decoration into idolatry, by a family of priests sidelined by Jeroboam. Juha Pakkala suggests everything between verses 12:31a and 13:33b were secondary expansions and there were never golden calves originally assosiated with Jeroboam. Verses 12:32 and 33 in particular contain "incomprehensible" wording, and disrupt the connection between 28 and 31, where "So the king took council" in 28 is the direct antecedent of "He made a house on high places and appointed priests" in 31.

The declarations of Aaron's people and Jeroboam are almost identical:

- 'These are your gods, O Israel, who brought you up from the land of Egypt' (Exod 32:4, 8);
- 'Behold your gods, O Israel, who brought you up from the land of Egypt' (1 Kings 12:28)

After making the golden calf or golden calves, both Aaron and Jeroboam celebrate festivals. Aaron builds an altar and Jeroboam ascends an altar (Exod 32:5–6; 1 Kings 12:32–33).

== Jewish views ==
The devotion of Israel to this worship of the calf was partly explained by a circumstance at passing through the Red Sea, when they beheld the most distinct creature about the Celestial Throne which is the resemblance of ox, then they thought it was an ox who had helped God in their journey from Egypt. After seeing Hur, son of Miriam, who was carelessly murdered by the people following his rebuke of their ingratitude action to God, Aaron was willing rather to take a sin upon himself to make an idol than to cast the burden of an evil deed upon the people if they commit so terrible sin of killing a priest and prophet among them. Also there would be among the Israelites no priestly caste, and the nation would have been a nation of priests only if Israel had not sinned through worshiping the golden calf that the greater part of the people lost the right to priesthood, except the tribe of Levi as the only tribe who remained faithful to God and did not partake in this sinful deed.

Later references in the Hebrew Bible to the Golden Calf in Psalm 106 and Nehemiah 9 emphasize divine forgiveness following the Israelites' breach of the covenant. Likewise, rabbinic interpretations emphasized divine forgiveness or attributed the sin to Egyptian influences. The eighth-century rabbinic work Pirke de-Rabbi Eliezer, used the Golden Calf narrative to address contemporary theological and political concerns, including Byzantine icon veneration.

According to Nachman of Breslov, everyone contributed to the building of the Tabernacle, and the contribution that each Jew made was his or her good points. Thus, the Tabernacle was built by the good points found in each person; this was sufficient to counteract the blemish of the golden calf. The "good points" are reflected in the "gold, silver and copper" that the Jews donated. The various colors of these metals reflect the Supernal Colors and the beauty of a person's good deeds.

In Legends of the Jews, the Conservative rabbi and scholar Louis Ginzberg wrote that the worship of the golden calf was the disastrous consequence for Israel who took a mixed multitude in their exodus from Egypt. Had not the mixed multitude joined them, Israel would not have been misled to worship this molten idol. The form of the calf itself came from a magical virtue of an ornament leaf with the image of the bull which is made by Aaron.

== Christian views ==
Justus Knecht gives two important moral points from the episode of the golden calf: 1) The Mercy of God. "The people of Israel had sinned horribly against God by their idolatry, and yet, at Moses’ intercession, He forgave them." 2) Idolatry. "The weak people were most ungrateful and faithless to God. The Lord had done such great things for them! Only forty days before, full of holy fear, they had heard His voice and had repeatedly promised obedience to His Commandments; and now they transgressed the first and most important of them, and forsook God to worship idols. Saint Paul calls lust and covetousness idolatry. Whenever a man loves anything more than he loves God, he is guilty of idolatry."

== Islamic views ==
The incident of the worship of the golden calf is narrated in the second chapter of the Quran, named Al-Baqarah, and other works of Islamic literature. The Quran narrates that after they refused to enter the promised land, God decreed that as punishment the Israelites would wander for forty years. Moses continued to lead the Israelites to Mount Sinai for divine guidance. According to Islamic literature, God ordered Moses to fast for forty nights before receiving the guidance for the Israelites. When Moses completed the fasts, he approached God for guidance. During this time, Moses had instructed the Israelites that Aaron was to lead them.

The Israelites grew restless, since Moses had not returned to them, and after thirty days, a man the Quran names as Samiri raised doubts among the Israelites. Samiri claimed that Moses had forsaken the Israelites and ordered his followers among the Israelites to light a fire and bring him all the jewelry and gold ornaments they had. Samiri fashioned the gold into a golden calf along with the dust on which the angel Gabriel had trodden, which he proclaimed to be the God of Moses and the God who had guided them out of Egypt. There is a sharp contrast between the Quranic and the biblical accounts of the prophet Aaron's actions. The Quran mentions that Aaron attempted to guide and warn the people from worshipping the golden calf. However, the Israelites refused to stop until Moses had returned. The righteous separated themselves from the pagans. God informed Moses that He had tested the Israelites in his absence and that they had failed by worshipping the golden calf.

Returning to the Israelites in great anger, Moses asked Aaron why he had not stopped the Israelites when he had seen them worshipping the golden calf. The Quran reports that Aaron stated that he did not act due to the fear that Moses would blame him for causing divisions among the Israelites and that he was afraid of being killed, he explained "Son of my mother, indeed this people thought me to be weak, and they were about to kill me. So do not let the enemies gloat over me, and do not take me with the wrongdoing lot." Moses realized his helplessness in the situation, and both prayed to God for forgiveness. According to Qur’anic sources Moses then questioned Samiri for the creation of the golden calf; Samiri justified his actions by stating that he had thrown the dust of the ground upon which Gabriel had tread on into the fire because his soul had suggested it to him. Moses informed him that he would be banished and that they would burn the golden calf and spread its dust into the sea. Moses ordered seventy delegates to repent to God and pray for forgiveness. The delegates traveled alongside Moses to Mount Sinai, where they witnessed the speech between him and God but refused to believe until they had witnessed God with their sight. As punishment, God struck the delegates with lightning and killed them with a violent earthquake. Moses prayed to God for their forgiveness. God forgave and resurrected them and they continued on their journey.

In the Islamic view, the calf-worshipers' sin had been shirk (Arabic: شرك), the sin of idolatry or polytheism. Shirk is the deification or worship of anyone or anything other than God (Allah in Arabic) or more literally the establishment of "partners" placed beside God, a most serious sin. Later eighth-century tafsīr interpretations developed the account further, depicting the calf as animate.

== Historical interpretation ==
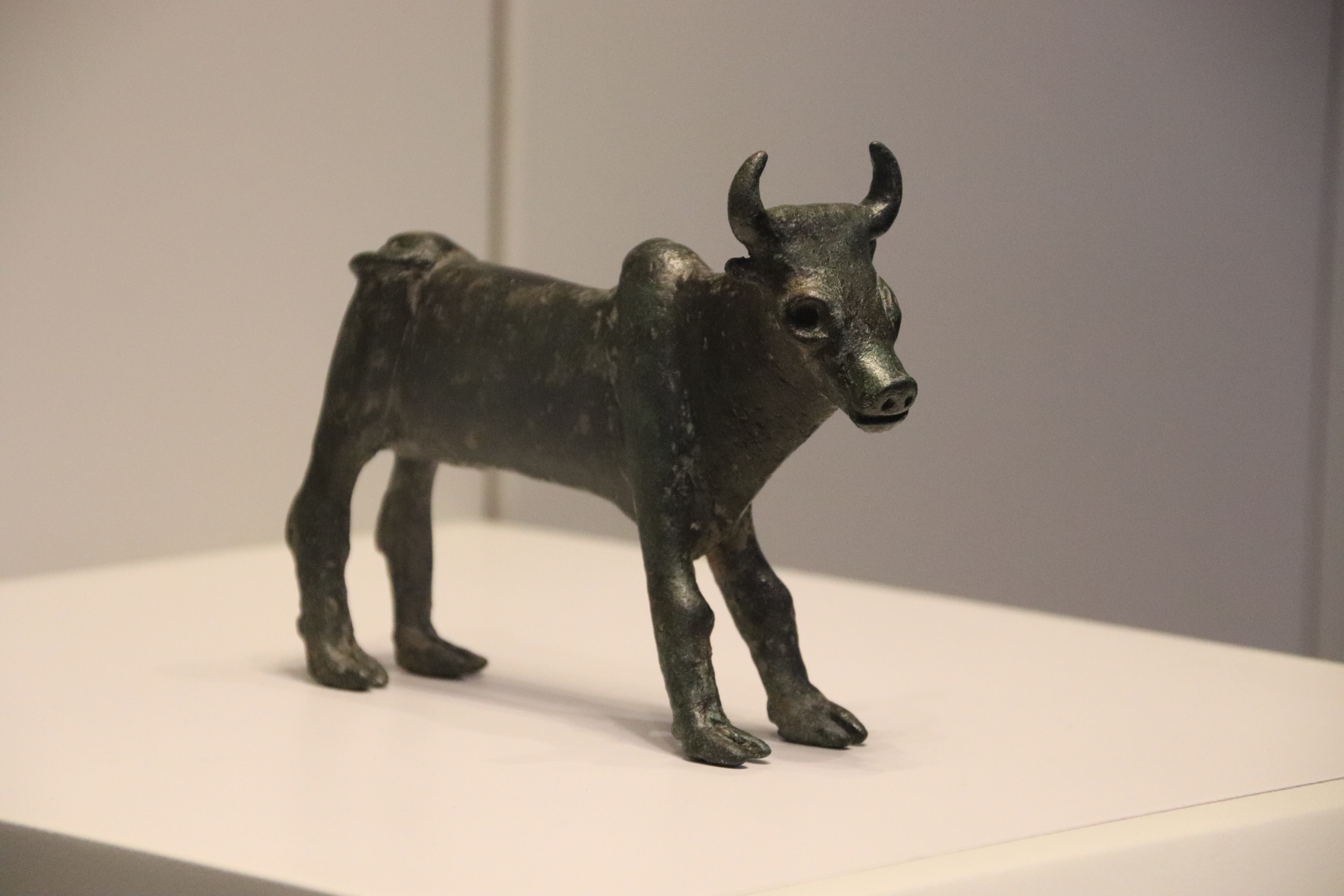
Bronze bull statuette associated with the Bull Site in the Samaria highlands, c. 12th century BCE

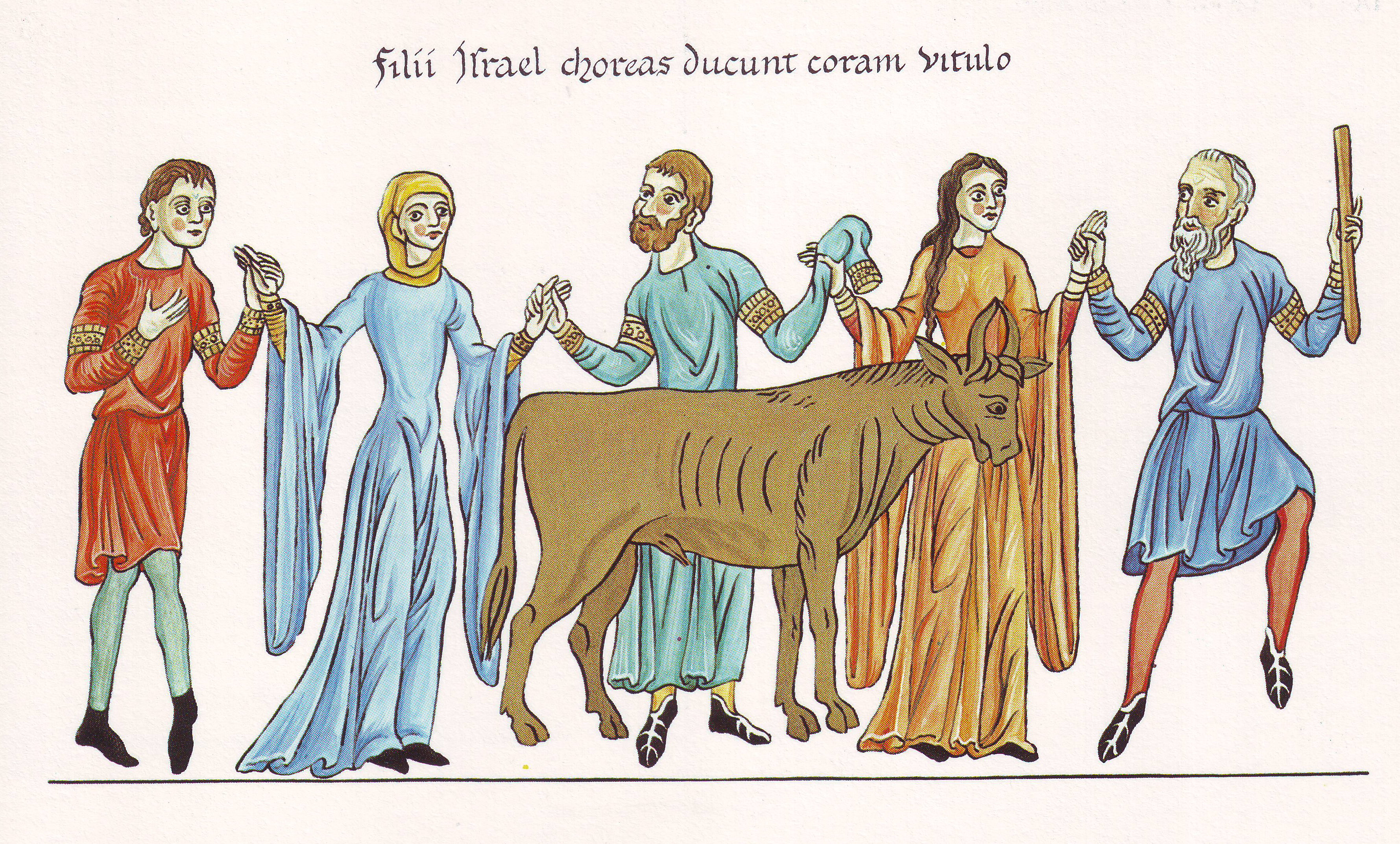
The Adoration of the Golden Calf, from the Hortus deliciarum of Herrad of Landsberg (12th century)

Scholars have established varying interpretations about the literary relationship between the golden calf narrative in Exodus 32 and the account of Jeroboam's calves at Bethel and Dan in 1 Kings 12:26–33. The two accounts undeniably contain closely parallel proclamations, identifying the calf or calves with the god or gods who brought Israel out of Egypt (Exodus 32:4, 8; 1 Kings 12:28). Moses Aberach and Leivy Smolar identified that both narratives are firstly dealing with golden calves, have the same address in "Behold your gods, O Israel, who brought you up out of the land of Egypt", establishment of alters and feasts, distinctions are made between Levites and non-Levite priests, and the sons of Aaron and Jeroboam have the same names and they all die prematurely. The use of "gods" in the Exodus narrative, is seen as an allusion to the original reference in 1 Kings where there was more than one statue. However, there has not been a consistent agreed upon date or purpose for the narrative.

Robert A. Di Vito argues that the Exodus narrative draws upon the tradition of Jeroboam's calves and projects criticism of northern worship back into the wilderness period. Gary N. Knoppers, by contrast, argues that the account in 1 Kings 12 is a polemical reworking of Exodus 32 directed against Jeroboam and his sanctuaries. James W. Watts notes that scholars have also increasingly dated part or all of Exodus 32 to the postexilic period and have interpreted the chapter in relation to competing presentations of Aaron and the priesthood within the Pentateuch.

The identity and function of the calf are likewise disputed. Aaron proclaims a festival to Yahweh in Exodus 32:5, and Jeroboam's sanctuaries are presented as alternatives to worship in Jerusalem rather than as sanctuaries of an explicitly named foreign deity. These features have led many interpreters to associate the calves with the worship of Yahweh, although they disagree about the nature of that association. Proposed interpretations include a direct image or symbol of a deity, an animal embodying divine attributes, a pedestal or mount for an otherwise invisible deity, and a mediating figure intended to replace Moses. Other interpretations identify the calf with a deity distinct from Yahweh. Michael B. Hundley argues that the different voices and perspectives within Exodus 32 should be distinguished and that the calf cannot be adequately explained by any single ancient Near Eastern parallel.

Michael H. Coogan argued the it that the golden calf was not an idol to another god, and it was meant to be the pedestal of Yahweh. In ancient Near Eastern art, gods were often depicted standing on an animal and not always on a throne. This reading posits that the golden calf was an alternative to the Ark of the Covenant or the cherubim upon which the Israelite deity was enthroned. Coogan believes it was later interpreted as a polemic in the Exodus account in the time of Josiah to discredit a custom that was rooted in the northern kingdom of identifying Yahweh with a bull. The cult of the bull itself was common in Canaan during pre-Israelite times.

Under the documentary hypothesis, scholars state that the earliest story of the golden calf was preserved by E originating in the north. When E and J were combined in the south after the fall of Samaria, the narrative was reworked to portray the northern kingdom negatively, with the worship of the calf being rendered as idolatry. When compiling the narratives, the P editor of Exodus may have retrojected the story from 1 Kings into the time of Moses and minimizing Aaron's guilt, while preserving the priestly polemics against the calves. The D source would see Jeroboam's rejection of the temple and priesthood as heresy, and it being responsible for the destruction of the northern kingdom. Richard Elliott Friedman alternatively stated that the smashing of the Ten Commandments by Moses when he beheld the worship of the golden calf, is similarly an attempt by the authors to cast into doubt the validity of Judah's central shrine, the Ark of the Covenant. Thus, the golden calf story attacked both the Israelite and Judean religious establishments. As the area of Bethel and Dan were unoccupied during the late 10th century when Jeroboam I was supposed to rule, the story's scenario may not provide reliable information about the time, but they were in the 8th century when Jeroboam II was in control. The D source is then back fitting later religious controversies into the past. The notion that Jeroboam excluded Levite priests has also been increasingly seen as rhetorical additions by the priestly.

Rainer Albertz argues that in 1 Kings 12:28, when Jeroboam introduced the worship of golden calves in Bethel and Dan, it was simply a return to the traditional Israelite religion, as opposed to the syncretistic innovations introduced by David and Solomon in attempting to centralize the cult in Jerusalem.

Archaeological evidence demonstrates that bull imagery was present in the southern Levant before the proposed reign of Josiah. A bronze bull figurine was found at the so-called Bull Site east of Tel Dothan. Amihai Mazar dated the site to the early Iron Age I period, approximately the 12th-11th century BCE, and interpreted it as an open-air cult place. It is cautioned that the site's religious function and the cultural identity of its users could not be established securely from the surviving evidence. The find supplies evidence for the regional use of bull imagery, but does not by itself establish which deity the figurine represented or the date and purpose of the narrative in Exodus 32.

=== As adoration of wealth ===
In later religious and political rhetoric, the golden calf became a metaphor for wealth or material gain treated as an object of devotion. The Spanish expression becerro de oro similarly denotes money or riches.

== In popular culture ==
=== Eponymous subjects ===
- Le veau d'or est toujours debout (The Golden Calf is still standing), an aria in Charles Gounod's opera Faust
- Cave of the Golden Calf, a notorious nightclub in Edwardian London, created by Frida Uhl
- The Golden Calf and the Altar, an episode in the unfinished opera Moses und Aron, a three-act, uncompleted opera by Arnold Schoenberg
- The Golden Calf, a sculpture by conceptual artist Damien Hirst
- The Golden Calf, a song on the Prefab Sprout album From Langley Park to Memphis
- Mooby the Golden Calf, a fictional character featured in the works of Kevin Smith
- The Little Golden Calf, a satirical novel by Soviet authors Ilf and Petrov
- Cash Cow (A Rock Opera In Three Small Acts), a song on the Steve Taylor album Squint
- Dance Around the Golden Calf, a painting by Emil Nolde
- The Calf of Dan, a sculpture by James W. Washington Jr.

=== Others ===
- In Episode 79 of the U. S. television series Batman, a Golden Calf full of money was stolen by The Riddler

== See also ==
- Bull of Heaven
- Canaanite religion
- Cattle in religion
- Erev Rav
- Gugalanna
- Ki Tissa and Eikev, Torah parshiot dealing with the Golden Calf
- Red heifer
- Sacred bull
- Tauroctony
