= Bureau of Immigration Bicutan Detention Center =

Primary immigration detention center in the Philippines

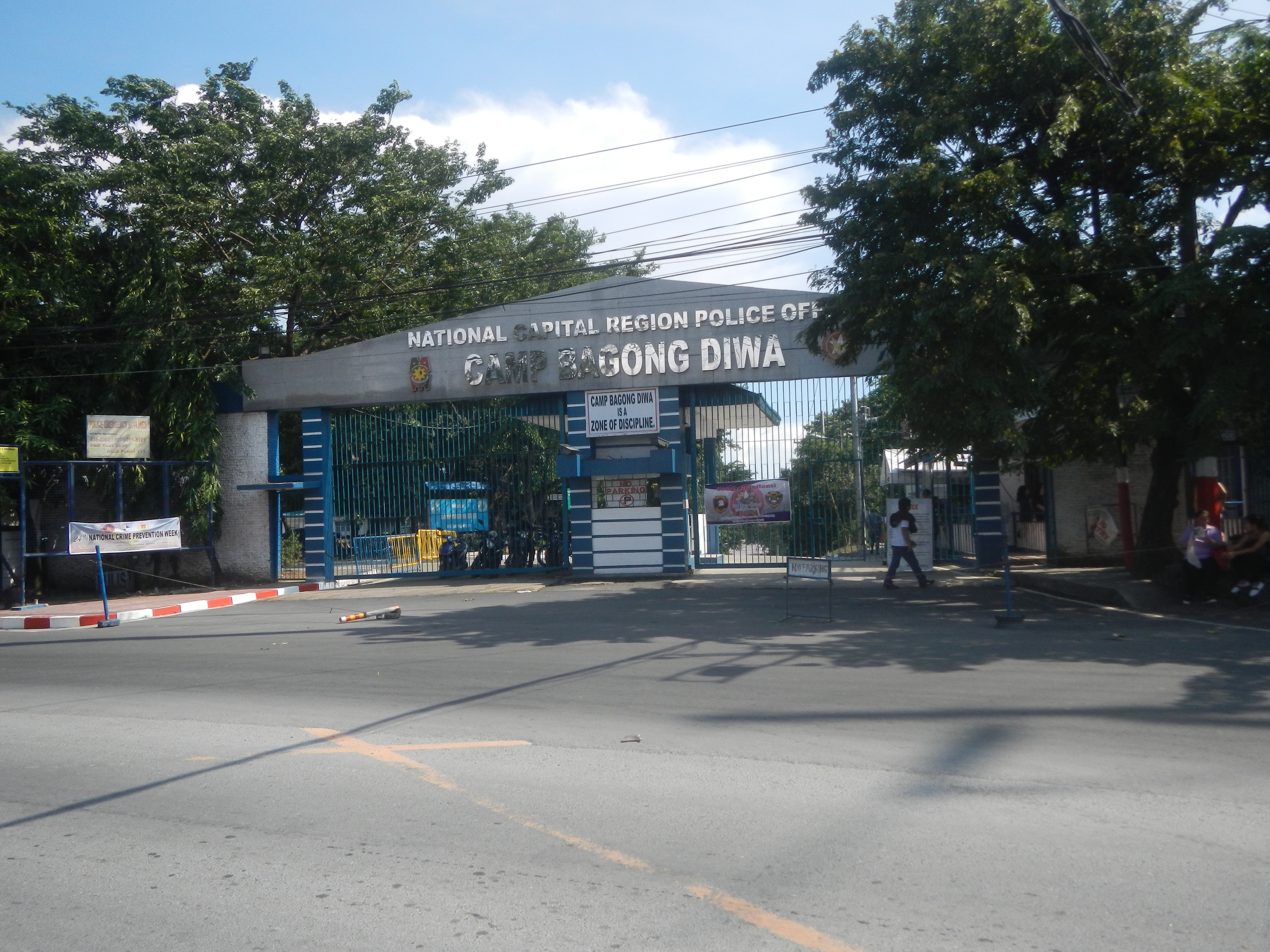
- The gate of Camp Bagong Diwa, within which the Bicutan Detention Center sits.

- Location in Metro Manila Location in Luzon Location in the Philippines
- Location: Camp Bagong Diwa, Lower Bicutan, Taguig, Metro Manila; 14°29′05″N 121°03′19″E
- Status: Operational
- Security class: Immigration detention center
- Capacity: 140
- Population: 418 (April 2020)
- Former name: BID Detention Center
- Managed by: Bureau of Immigration
- Director: Commissioner Norman G. Tansingco
- Warden: OIC Leander F. Catalo

The Bureau of Immigration Bicutan Detention Center (BI–Bicutan) is the principal immigration detention center administered by the Bureau of Immigration of the Philippines. Located inside Camp Bagong Diwa, in Lower Bicutan, Taguig, the facility is known internally as the Warden Facility and Protection Unit (WFPU). However, in press releases and public statements, the Bureau variously refers to the facility as a "jail", "warden facility" or "detention center". The function of the facility is to hold foreign detainees who are awaiting deportation, for example, because they have pending criminal cases, or because they are accused of having overstayed their visas.

Perennially overcrowded, it has been accused of widespread human rights abuses and has been compared to a gulag by The Manila Times. As an administrative detention center, there is no constitutional right to bail from BI–Bicutan, and some detainees have spent upwards of ten years there, neither convicted of a crime nor deported from the country.

== Foundation ==
The Philippine government only became interested in regulating the length of stay of all aliens during the American colonial period. In 1932, an immigration detention center was built on Engineer Island, now known as Baseco. In March 1955, more than 100 Chinese detainees staged a hunger strike there. The Engineer Island Detention Center closed on 14 June 1975, and the 22 detainees were detained instead at Fort Bonifacio.

The site of the current BI–Bicutan was built during the regime of Ferdinand Marcos as a political prison; Camp Bagong Diwa housed many political prisoners under Marcos. After the collapse of the Marcos regime, incoming President Corazon Aquino began to free the political prisoners held at the camp. BI–Bicutan has fulfilled its current role since at least May 1999, when the Bureau of Immigration detained Ma Jing, a Chinese national, there, and the Supreme Court of the Philippines upheld the detention center's role as legal. By 2002, it already had a population of 140 detainees.

Located inside Camp Bagong Diwa, in Lower Bicutan, Taguig, the facility has since its founding been known internally variously as the Warden Facility and Protection Unit (WFPU) and the BI Warden Facility (BIWF). In its press releases and public statements, the Bureau variously refers to the facility as being a "jail", "warden facility" or "detention center", sometimes using multiple descriptions in the same statement.

== Functions ==
The function of BI–Bicutan within the Philippine immigration system is to detain foreign aliens, who are awaiting deportation for one of four main reasons:

- A country with which the Philippines has an extradition treaty requests extradition of an alien to face criminal charges in that country. (In April 2020, this represented only 10% of all foreign detainees.)
- The Bureau of Immigration itself declares an alien "undesirable", and moves to arrest and deport the alien. The alien need not have broken any law; the executive branch, via the Bureau, has full power to determine undesirability via a quasi-judicial proceeding; this power is vested in both the President of the Philippines and the Commissioner of the Bureau of Immigration.
- The Bureau of Immigration accuses an alien of breaking immigration law, for example by overstaying their visa or working without a permit, before its own Board of Commissioners, and moves to deport the alien on that basis.
- The alien has a pending criminal case, or "derogatory record". The Bureau of Immigration is copied on arrest warrants of foreigners, and may detain an alien as undesirable pending the outcome of their criminal case, even if the alien manages to bail themselves out of a Bureau of Jail Management and Penology (BJMP)-managed jail. The Bureau does neither renew nor implement visas of aliens with "derogatory records", so if their visa expires while they wait on a verdict, they can be detained for overstaying their visa, despite being ordered to do so as part of their conditions of bail by a Regional Trial Court (RTC). Even if found innocent at RTC, the Bureau may, legally, and at its discretion, deport the alien for the overstay; however, as of 2016 it, in at least one case, instead charges a fine if innocence is determined at RTC.

== Conditions ==
BI–Bicutan is notorious for its squalid conditions. Designed only to hold a maximum of 140 detainees, the facility in May 2020 held over 400 detainees, an overcrowding rate of ≥285%.

On a fact-finding mission conducted by Human Rights Without Frontiers (HRWF) in September 2016 and accepted as a submission by the United Nations High Commissioner for Human Rights at a time when BI–Bicutan held 147 detainees, the conditions were described as "appalling", the provided food as "meager rations" which detainees supplement with their own money; a complete lack of medical care was also noted.

A report by Howard Johnson, a BBC correspondent, on Victoria Derbyshire, noted the center's overcrowding, rat infestation, and "lack of basic facilities". In interviews conducted by Johnson, former and current detainees alleged being denied food, being locked in small cages, and suffering illness due to pests, and showed evidence of such allegations that they captured with smuggled cell phones.

In May 2019, British ambassador to the Philippines Daniel Pruce personally visited BI–Bicutan. He, and the European Union ambassador to the Philippines, at that time raised the issue with Filipino authorities of the "overcrowded", deprived conditions Britons and other foreign detainees were being held in.

Male and female detainees are segregated by sex, but at least as of 2007, male guards oversee both.

== Bail ==
Immigration bail may only be granted by the Commissioner of the Bureau of Immigration, as of 2020, Jaime Morente; RTC judges may not grant immigration bail, and while aliens have similar rights to Filipino citizens in acquiring bail from police custody and BJMP-managed jails, the Constitution of the Philippines does not guarantee a right to immigration bail.

Such bail, if ever granted, is usually granted on the advice of the Bureau's legal department, but this is not required, and the Commissioner frequently rejects bail applications even with the backing of the Bureau's lower offices. As of 2019, immigration bail was extremely difficult to acquire, even in minor cases such as visa overstays where the aliens in question were appealing the visa overstay allegations. During the 2020 Luzon enhanced community quarantine (ECQ) due to the COVID-19 pandemic in the Philippines, such bail became only marginally easier to acquire, as the overcrowded conditions provide a ready host for the virus. By 14 May, months into the ECQ, only two pregnant women had been granted immigration bail.

== Corruption allegations ==
In an analogous situation to the New Bilibid Prison, numerous high-profile allegations of corruption have been made, and wardens relieved of their duty for corruption.

Ramon Tulfo, a journalist at The Manila Times, in April 2019 used his column to allow a former detainee to write a piece; in it he alleged that BI–Bicutan officials frequently demand bribes from detainees to affect their release. Similar accusations were made by foreign detainees to the South China Morning Post, including by one Greek man who alleged that bribes of US$100,000 were demanded from him.

After a raid in April 2019, BI–Bicutan's then-warden Niño Oliver Dato was relieved of his duty for allowing some detainees to operate illegal online gambling websites from inside the facility; the Bureau of Immigration's Commissioner noted in a press release that he was relieved as "things had gotten worse" after a 22 January raid.

Some foreign detainees who are being detained pending extradition are alleged to engage in "pay-to-stay" schemes wherein they attempt to pay off Bureau of Immigration officials to slow down their deportation; notable is the case of Wang Bo, who was alleged to have paid bribes of ₱100 million to avoid being deported and had to answer for such in a hearing before the House of Representatives of the Philippines. Korean detainees who allegedly operate criminal internet businesses inside BI–Bicutan have been alleged to do so as well.

=== Escapes ===
In 2005, three foreign detainees accused of drug trafficking escaped BI–Bicutan, which led to an investigation of guards and immigration officials. In 2007, the United States Department of State reported that multiple detainees had gained release by paying cash bribes to guards. In January 2009, BI–Bicutan's then-warden Arsenio Samson and nine others were terminated for aiding in the escape of Korean fugitive Byung Kyu Choi, wanted in Seoul for allegedly embezzling ₩400 million. On 9 December 2014, American detainee Douglas Brent Jackson, awaiting deportation to the United States, sawed off the grill of a window and escaped BI–Davao, where he was temporarily being held instead of at BI–Bicutan as he had a pending estafa case. He was recaptured on 18 December and held in BI–Bicutan.

In October 2015, then-Commissioner Siegfried Mison said that some ten Bureau employees had accepted bribes of ₱1,000,000 from Korean fugitive Seongdae Cho, wanted for extortion in Korea, to help him escape BI–Bicutan. In the case of the escape of Cho, the National Bureau of Investigation in January 2016 recommended the filing of charges against seventeen Bureau employees after Cho escaped Bureau custody again. In March 2017, nine guards were relieved of duty for failing to prevent the escapes of fugitives Jung Jaeyul and Park Wang Yeol, wanted for murder in Korea.

On 31 January 2020, Song Yangrae was granted temporary leave from BI–Bicutan to be escorted by four guards to Taguig Pateros District Hospital for a medical evaluation; he escaped custody and fled to Floridablanca, and his escorts were accused of "obvious connivance" by Commissioner Morente.

== Satellite facilities ==
Due to the extreme overcrowding at BI–Bicutan, the Bureau of Immigration occasionally requests that other agencies of the Philippine government hold any overflow of aliens that would normally be detained at BI–Bicutan. There is also a satellite facility, the Bureau of Immigration Davao Detention Center (BI–Davao).

== See also ==
- Philippine Refugee Processing Center
