= Camp Bagong Diwa =

Police camp in Taguig, Philippines

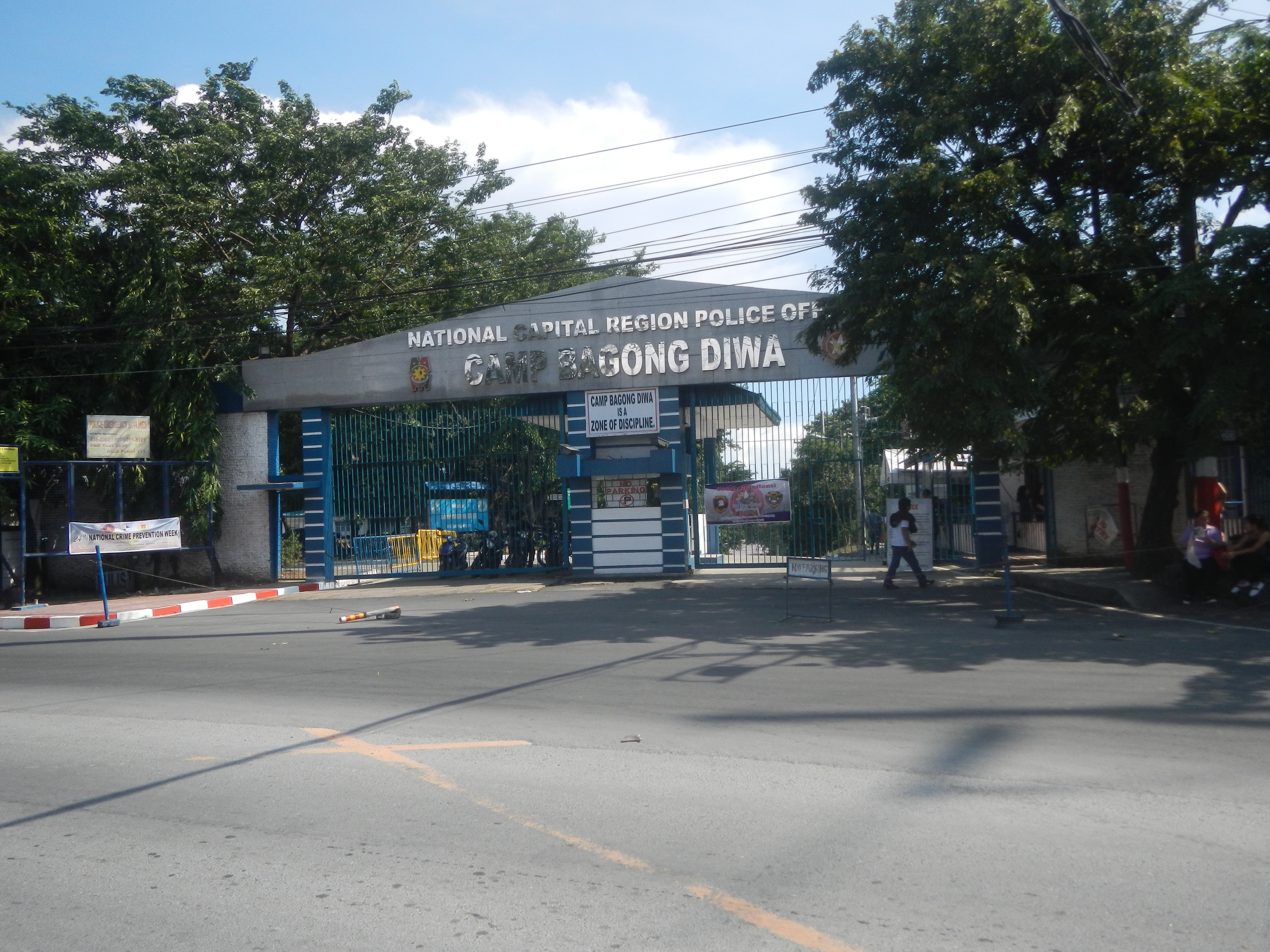
- The gate of the National Capital Region Police Office at Camp Bagong Diwa
- Interactive map of the Camp Bagong Diwa area

General information
- Location: Gen Santos Avenue, Lower Bicutan, Taguig, Philippines
- Coordinates: 14°29′12″N 121°03′23″E
- Current tenants: Philippine National Police; National Capital Region Police Office; Special Action Force; Bureau of Jail Management and Penology

Camp Bagong Diwa (lit. 'new spirit') is the headquarters of the National Capital Region Police Office, located in Lower Bicutan, Taguig, Philippines. It was formerly called as Camp Ricardo Papa in 1999 to early 2000s.

== Functions ==
The camp serves many functions: within its gates are enclosed a police academy and the Taguig City Jail, but also several jail "annexes" which house inmates the government believes to be too notorious or too dangerous to be safely housed among the regular prison population. As of December 2018, the camp contains the Manila City Jail Annex, the Quezon City Jail Annex, and the Metro Manila District Jail Annexes 1, 2, and 3.

The camp also contains the highest security prisons in the Philippines, the Bureau of Jail Management and Penology's Special Intensive Care Area (SICA) 1 and SICA 2.

As of 2018, within SICA 1 and 2 were housed accused terrorists of the Moro National Liberation Front, Abu Sayyaf, and Maute groups along with accused communist rebels from the New People's Army (Communist Party of the Philippines).

== History ==
=== During the Marcos dictatorship ===
During the Marcos dictatorship, Camp Bagong Diwa was known as the Bicutan Rehabilitation Center, a major detention center for political detainees. Some of the prominent prisoners kept there at different times include journalist Chelo Banal-Formoso, activist couple Mon and Ester Isberto, and in the aftermath of the September 1984 Welcome Rotonda protest dispersal, Senators Lorenzo Tanada and Soc Rodrigo, and future Senators Tito Guingona, Aquilino Pimentel Jr., and Joker Arroyo.

=== Prison riots ===
On 14 March 2005, inmates from the Abu Sayyaf Group rioted inside the prison in an apparent escape attempt and barricaded the second floor of the building, leading to a standoff which ended the next day when government forces stormed the prison. 24 Abu Sayyaf members, including three of the group's leaders, three prison guards and a police officer were killed.

On 7 May 2006, 14 inmates were injured in a two-hour riot between criminal gangs. Among the injured were four Abu Sayyaf members.

On 6 June 2017, two inmates were killed after a noise barrage held in protest over a five-day power outage descended into a riot between criminal gangs. Seventeen others were injured.

== Overcrowding status ==
As a general rule, for security reasons, the jails within Camp Bagong Diwa tend to be much less overcrowded than the Philippines jails outside; SICA 1 in April 2018 was only 25% overcrowded. However, this is not always the case; Camp Bagong Diwa also contains the Bureau of Immigration Bicutan Detention Center, which as of April 2020, is 278% overcrowded, with a capacity of 150 but a population of 418.
