= Philippine Refugee Processing Center =

- Refugee camp
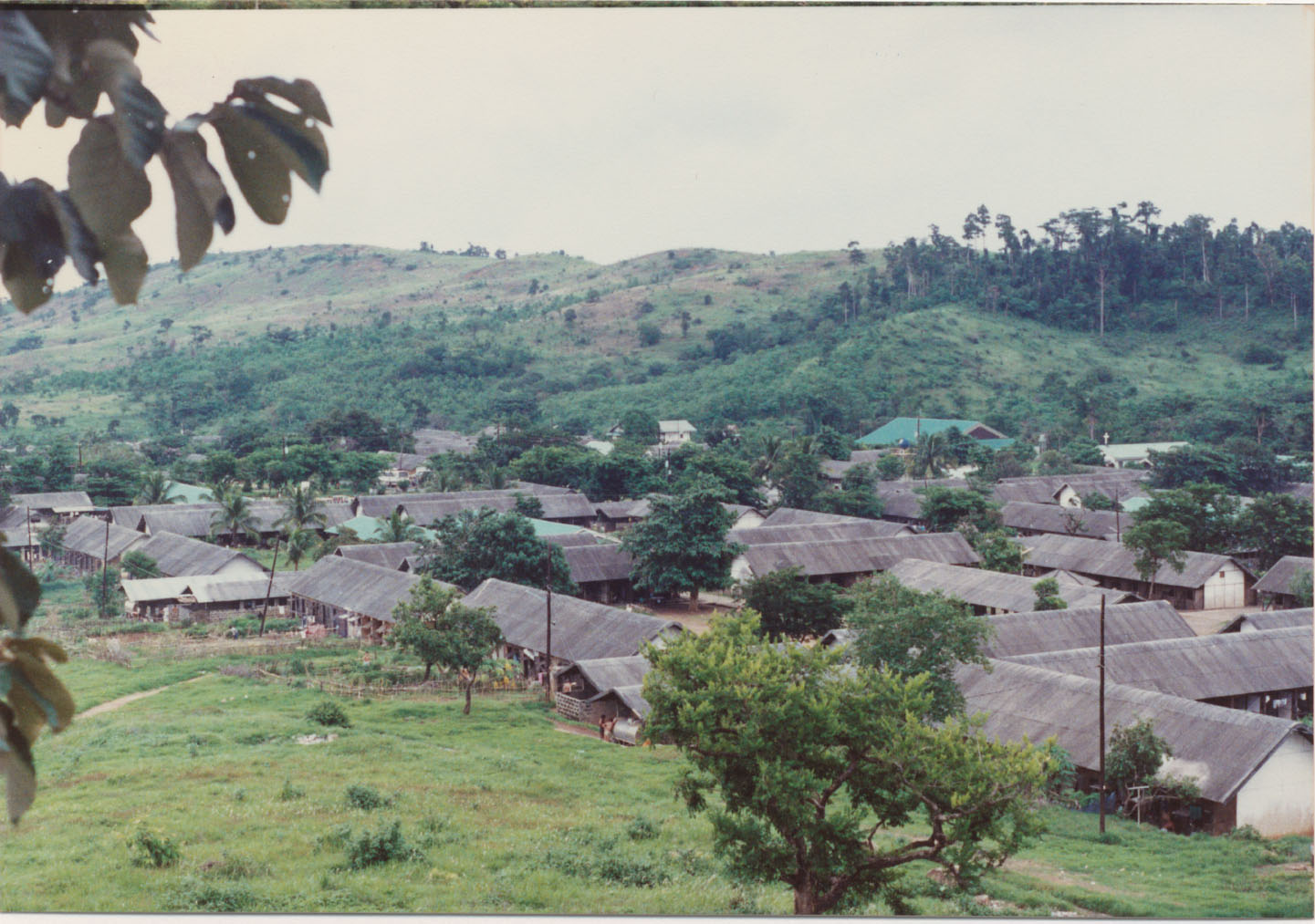
- The refugee camp in 1990

- Location in Luzon Location in the Philippines
- Coordinates: 14°42′45.16″N 120°17′25.92″E
- Country: Philippines
- Province: Bataan
- Municipality: Morong

The Philippine Refugee Processing Center (PRPC) was a large facility near Morong, Bataan, Philippines, which was used as the final stop for Indochinese refugees making their way to permanent resettlement in other nations. It was situated south of Subic Bay and north of the Bataan Nuclear Power Plant.

== Operational history ==
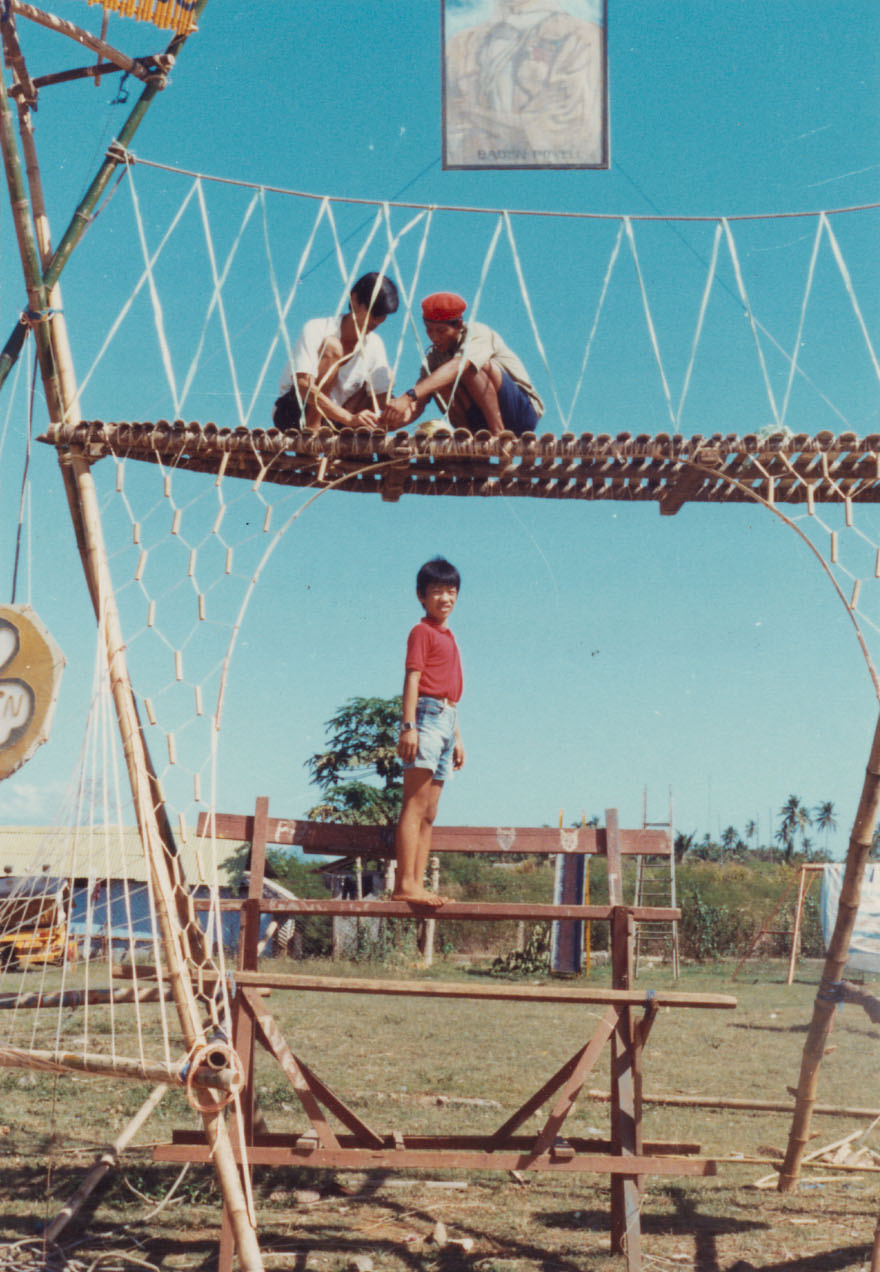
Vietnamese Boy Scouts at the Philippine First Asylum Center in Palawan (1990)

Opened in 1980, the Philippine Refugee Processing Center (PRPC) prepared Vietnamese, Cambodian, and Laotian refugees, including ethnic minorities (such as the Chinese) from Vietnam, Cambodia, and Laos, for immigration to a variety of resettlement nations such as Canada, Norway, Australia, France, and primarily the United States. An estimated 400,000 number of refugees were said to have settled in the area.

On February 21, 1981, Pope John Paul II visited the site and held a field mass which was attended by various refugees of different religion. During his visit, he sought for love and compassion for the Indochinese refugees and called for other nations to assist them in rebuilding their war-torn lives. A Vietnamese refugee crafted a wooden cross and gave it to the pope as tribute. In honor of the pope's visit, the Bataan Technology Park built the Replica of Papal Shrine near the actual grounds of where the mass was once held. It was inaugurated on May 2, 2011, the same day when Pope John Paul II was beatified in Rome.

PRPC funding came to an end in the early 1990s as the wave of Indochinese refugees went from a flood to a trickle. The site was permanently closed and fell to looters and squatters, and eventually into disrepair by the early 1990s. By the mid-1990s, the Government of the Philippines decided to reclaim the site from the jungle, and turned it into the Bataan Technology Park, loosely associated with the new complex which had been built on the nearby site of the former Subic Bay Naval Base. A museum dedicated to the refugee camp and experience now stands on part of the former site as well.

== Organization ==
PRPC was funded by the United Nations High Commissioner for Refugees and was capable of holding up to 18,000 refugees at any one time. Coupled with a large population of Filipino and employees from other developing countries, PRPC operated like a small city with schools, hospitals, libraries, restaurants, sports facilities, fire brigades, sewage treatment facilities, power generation facilities, water treatment centers, markets, and houses of worship for four religions.

== Refugee accommodation ==
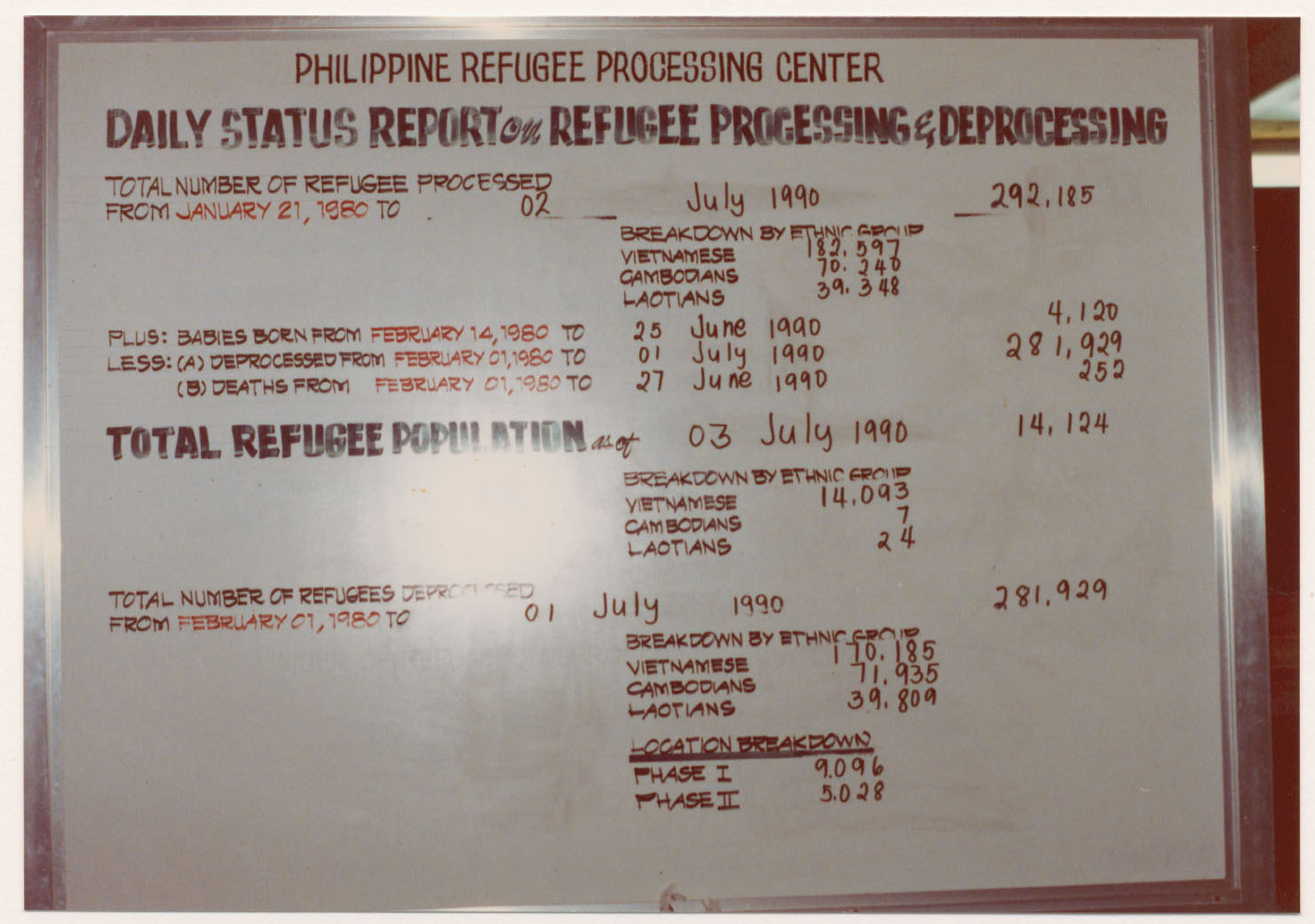
A board showing statistics in the center from 1980 to 1990

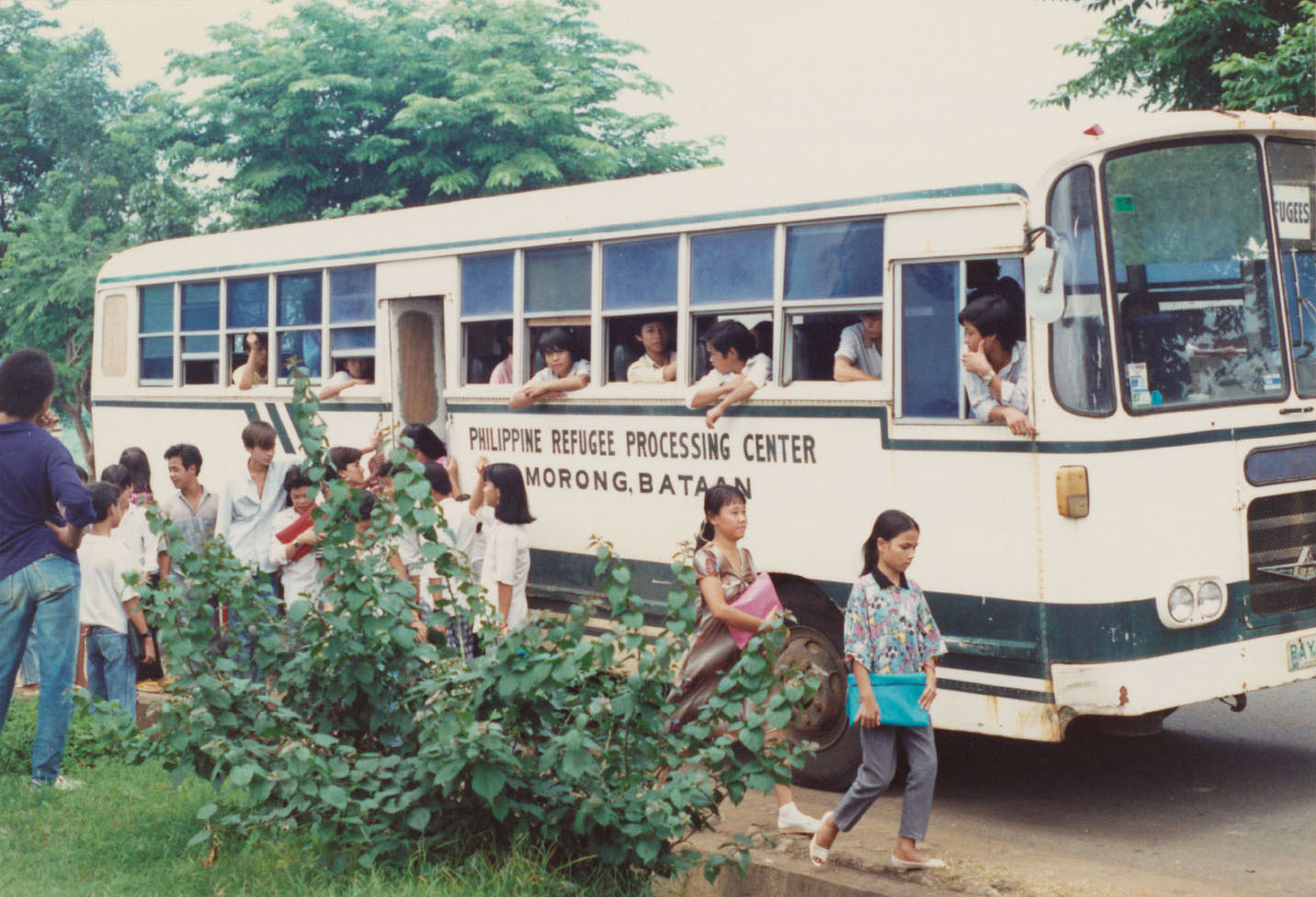
Philippine refugee processing center bus in 1990

The main functions of the camp were to hold the refugee population long enough to complete tuberculosis testing, wrap up bureaucratic requirements before departure, and—assuming the refugee was heading to an English speaking nation—give them an opportunity for English as a second language training. Virtually all refugees had confirmation before arrival at PRPC that they had been accepted to resettle in the West and therefore the mood among the refugee population was frequently upbeat and positive.

The ESL program was operated by the International Catholic Migration Commission (ICMC) and was funded by the U.S. Department of State. ICMC provided training to adult refugees aged 17 to 55. Aside from ESL classes, it offered Cultural Orientation (CO) and Work Orientation (WO). A similar ESL program was offered to children by World Relief through an extensive primary education program that took place within classrooms throughout the site.

== See also ==
- Bureau of Immigration Bicutan Detention Center

== Notes ==
- The ICMC ESL/CO Program and PRPC was still fully operational in 1993. The program closed in 1995
- Bankston, Carl L. (1996). "Refuge (An Essay on Lao Buddhism in PRPC)" (PDF). Sycamore Review. 8 (1): 54–66. Archived from the original (PDF) on March 3, 2016.
