= Min Zhou =

American sociologist

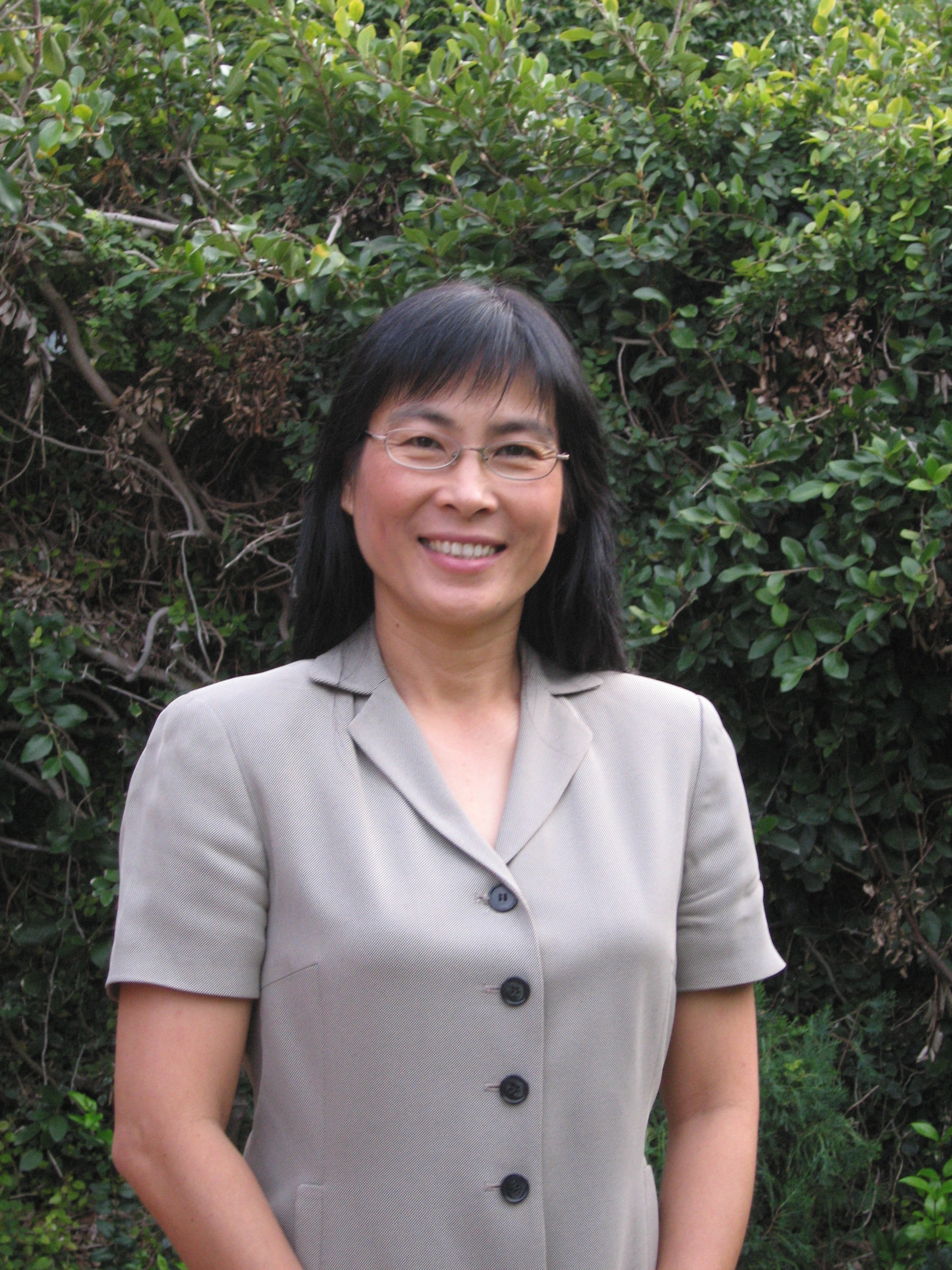
- Min Zhou in 2006

Academic background
- Education: State University of New York at Albany
- Thesis: The Enclave Economy and Immigrant Incorporation in New York City's Chinatown (1989)
- Doctoral advisor: John R. Logan
- Other advisor: Richard Alba

Min Zhou (Chinese: 周敏; born July 14, 1956, in Zhongshan) is a Chinese-born American sociologist. In 2023, she was elected to the National Academy of Sciences.

== Career ==
Zhou completed a bachelor's degree in English at Sun Yat-sen University in 1982, and became a lecturer at her alma mater until 1984, when she began graduate study. She enrolled at the State University of New York at Albany, earning a Master of Arts and doctorate in sociology in 1985 and 1989, respectively. Zhou started her teaching career as an assistant professor at Louisiana State University in 1990, then moved to the University of California, Los Angeles (UCLA) in 1994, where she was promoted to associate and later full professor. After four years as chair of the Asian American studies interdepartmental degree program, Zhou became the founding chair of the university's Department of Asian American Studies in 2005.

The Walter and Shirley Wang Endowed Chair in U.S.-China Relations and Communications was established at UCLA in 2008. Zhou assumed the position in 2009, and has also served Singapore's Nanyang Technological University as Tan Lark Sye Chair Professor between 2013 and 2016. Zhou has worked with Carl L. Bankston to expand the definition of social capital to not only include the resources held by individuals or groups, but also the processes of social interaction leading to constructive outcomes. This work and redefinition has helped spur the modern understanding of social capital and its interplay between power groups.

Zhou's other sociological insights have been primarily within the fields of immigrant life and ethnic assimilation, particularly focused on the Asian American community. She has authored or co-authored two noted books spotlighting various sociological aspects of immigrant life—Chinatown: The Socioeconomic Potential of an Urban Enclave (Temple University Press, 1992) and Growing Up American: How Vietnamese Children Adapt to Life in the United States (Russell Sage Foundation Press, 1998). Zhou was also the coeditor of Contemporary Asian America (New York University Press, 2000) and Asian American Youth: Culture, Identity, and Ethnicity (Rutledge, 2004). Zhou and Jennifer Lee co-wrote “The Asian American Achievement Paradox, and shared the 2017 Association for Asian American Studies Social Science Award. The same book won three other awards from the American Sociological Association (ASA). Later that year, Zhou received the Distinguished Career Award from the ASA's Section on International Migration. Also, Zhou was elected to be the director of the International Society for the Study of Chinese Overseas (ISSCO).
