= Erev Rav =

Group that included Egyptians and others who had joined the Israelites on the Exodus

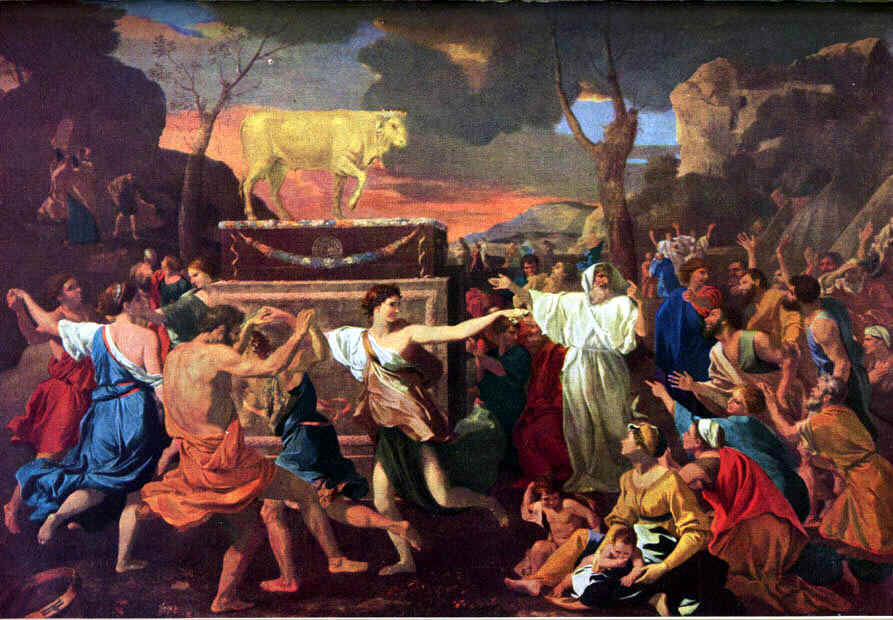
The Adoration of the Golden Calf by Nicolas Poussin

Erev Rav (Hebrew: עֵרֶב רַב ‘êreḇ raḇ "mixed multitude") was a group that included Egyptians and others who had joined the Tribes of Israel on the Exodus. According to Jewish tradition, they were accepted by Moses as an integral part of the people. Their influence is said to have been involved in the golden calf and other incidents where the people questioned Moses and his laws.

According to contemporary Orthodox Jewish commentary Da'at Miqra, the words roughly correspond to the "mixed many", while Targum Onkelos translates it as "many foreigners". The term appears in Exodus 12:38: "A mixed crowd also went up with them, and livestock in great numbers, both flocks and herds". The "mixed crowd" is an English rendering of Erev Rav. While Exodus 12:38 is the only mention of the complete term Erev Rav in the entire Tanakh, the term erev by itself (which also means evening in Hebrew), also appears in Nehemiah 13:3, where it is used to refer to non-Jews. Biblical scholar Shaul Bar has suggested that the term may have referred specifically to foreign mercenaries who intermarried with the Israelite people in Egypt. Israel Knohl suggested that the word erev may be cognate to the Akkadian urbi, referring to a kind of soldier.

According to Isaac Luria, in every generation the souls of the Erev Rav are reincarnated in numerous individuals. The Zohar, which is the foundational text for Kabbalistic thought, explains the Erev Rav are the cause for most of the problems affecting the Jewish people. Currently, the term Erev Rav is used by Israeli Jews in a derogatory manner to describe someone who is perceived as a traitor. Recently, progressive interpretations see Erev Rav in a positive frame, as "a mixed multitude of people from all walks of life — who set out together in pursuit of something better." In this reading, the Erev Rav suggests that the fate of Jewish people is connected to the fate of all peoples and that Jewish safety cannot exist in isolation.

== See also ==
- Am ha'aretz
