= Dominant culture =

Sociological term for a cultural phenomenon

A dominant culture is a cultural practice within a particular political, social or economic entity, in which multiple cultures co-exist. It may refer to a language, religion or ritual practices, social value and/or social custom. These features are often a norm for an entire society. An individual achieves dominance by being perceived as belonging to that majority culture, which has a significant presence in institutions related to communication, education, artistic expression, law, government and business. The concept of "dominant culture" is generally used in academic discourse in communication, sociology, anthropology and cultural studies.

In a society, culture is established and directed by the individuals with most power (hegemony). In a culture, a group of people that have the ability to hold power over social institutions and influence the rest of the society's beliefs and actions is considered dominant. A dominant culture is established in a society by a group of individuals that direct the ruling ideas, values, and beliefs that become the dominant worldview of a society. Individuals from the dominant culture spread their dominant ideologies through institutions such as education, religion, and politics. A dominant culture makes use of media and laws to spread their ideologies as well. Furthermore, a dominant culture can be promoted deliberately and by the suppression of minority cultures or subcultures.

The culture that is dominant within a particular geopolitical entity can change over time in response to internal or external factors, but one is usually very resilient. Antonio Gramsci has written that the masses are in the grip of a monolithic ruling class. However, the overall picture that Gramsci provides is not a static, closed system of ruling-class domination. Rather, he states that a society is in constant process, where the creation of counter-hegemonies remains a live option.

The concept of a dominant culture, or the concept of hegemony, originated in Ancient Greece. Although Vladimir Lenin, a politician and a political theorist, defined the concept as “Domination,” Gramsci redefined it as “an intellectual and moral leadership directed by contradictory political and cultural agents and organizations.” He called these organizations “organic and traditional intellectuals” which represented the interest of the working class.

== Examples of dominant cultures ==
=== Turkey ===
Scholars have characterized Turkishness (particulatly Sunni Turks) as comprising the ethnoculturally dominant identity, arguing that state-sponsored Turkification policies have contributed to the assimilation, marginalization, and discrimination of Turkey's ethnoreligious minorities. Political scientist Thomas W. Smith writes that "all but the most folkloric of minority cultural expressions have been discouraged" within the country, describing how Turkish nationalism has disadvantaged minority communities through language, education, religious, and cultural policies. Sociologist İpek Demir characterizes Turkishness as a "master identity", while Zeki Sarigil identifies documents substantial prejudice against ethnic minorities. Other researchers have documented the enforcement of Turkish linguistic dominance through campaigns against minority languages, the assimilation of Laz communities through educational policies and socioeconomic incentives, and early republican economic policies favoring a Turkish capitalist class at the expense of non-Muslim minorities, particularly Christians.

According to scholar Ayhan Aktar, one of the goals during the establishment of Turkey was to ensure "the domination of Turkish ethnic identity in every aspect of social life from the language that people speak in the streets to the language to be taught at schools, from the education to the industrial life, from the trade to the cadres of state officials, from the civil law to the settlement of citizens to particular regions." Several scholars have characterized the dominance of Turkish national culture and the suppression of minority identities in Turkey as forms of genocide.

Several Turkish historians and political scholars have characterized Turkey as an apartheid state, arguing that its political and legal institutions were founded upon systematic ethnic, religious, and cultural discrimination that persists into the present. Taner Akçam traces the system to the Turkish War of Independence and the establishment of the Republic during the Turkish National Movement between 1918 and 1923, arguing that the new state combined the religious hierarchies of the Ottoman millet system with ethnic Turkish nationalism and colonial practices, creating a three-tiered hierarchy of citizenship: Sunni Muslim Turks at the top, Alevis and non-Turkish Muslims in an intermediate category, and Christians and Jews at the bottom. Proponents cite legislation and administrative practices that excluded Christians from certain parliamentary elections, confiscated Christian properties, restricted the residence and movements of Christians, classified and surveilled citizens according to ethnic ancestry. Kılıçdağı emphasizes that these practices constituted institutionalized discrimination embedded in laws, decrees, and administrative directives rather than isolated incidents of prejudice, citing parliamentary proceedings revealing deliberate efforts to deny Christian citizens restitution for confiscated property. Akçam further distinguishes between the forced assimilation of non-Turkish Muslims and the enduring exclusion of Christians and Jews, arguing that these policies institutionalized unequal citizenship. Köker endorses the characterization, arguing that the discriminatory order was integral to the Republic's founding rather than a subsequent deviation from its principles, while Akçam maintains that understanding Turkey's history through the establishment of apartheid, rather than exclusively through national liberation, is essential.

=== United States ===
In the United States, for example, a distinction is often made between the indigenous culture of Native Americans, and a dominant culture that may be described as "WASP", "Anglo", "white", "middle class", and so on. Some Native Americans are seen as being part of the culture of their own tribe, community, or family, while simultaneously participating in the dominant culture of America as a whole. Also, ethnic groups are said to exist in the United States in relation to a dominant culture, generally seen as English-speaking, of European ancestry, and Protestant Christian faith. Asian Americans, Jews, African Americans, Latinos, and Deaf people, among others, are seen as facing a choice to oppose, be opposed by, assimilate into, acculturate (i.e. exist alongside), or otherwise react to the dominant culture.

== Interactions between dominant culture and co-culture ==
Co-culture consists of minority groups, or groups whose beliefs and values differ from the dominant culture. In the United States, minority groups such as LGBTQ+, women, and black or African American members, for example, can experience negative effects resulting from their interaction with the dominant culture. Minority groups can be victims of stress produced by the dominant culture. Minority stress can be described as the product that results from the differences between the minority and dominant values. Furthermore, minority stress is the outcome of the conflict that minority group members experience with their social environment.

=== LGBTQ+ Community ===
Members from the LGBTQ+ community, that live in a heterosexist society, are susceptible and inclined to suffer from chronic stress due to their stigmatization. Minority stressors include internalized homophobia, stigma and experiences of violence and discrimination. Internalized homophobia can be described as an LGBTQ+ member's disposition to societal negative attitudes towards the self while stigma refers to an LGBTQ+ member's expectation of discrimination and rejection.

=== Women ===
Women, as many other co-culture groups, are greatly affected by the dominant culture that surround them. The dominant culture tend to perceive women as less worthy of economic and educational opportunities. Also, in many cultures, women are expected to behave in a certain way and be responsible for tasks that men are not as they are also subject to double standards. These interactions can lead to unfavorable and negative effects on women. For example, women can feel restricted from expressing freely, fighting for their aspirations, and trying new activities.

=== Black and African American community ===
Globally, black or African American communities have been affected by the dominant cultures. In different countries, in order for black people to incorporate into the cultural hegemony, they were frequently isolated from their own cultural group, or an attempt was made to eradicate their culture completely. Many examples of cultural alienation and annihilation can be found across black and African American communities.

== See also ==
- Cultural assimilation
- Dominant narrative
- Hegemony
- Cultural homogenization
- Life stance
- Moral development
- Respectability politics
- Social integration
- Social privilege
