= Richard Alba =

American sociologist (1942–2025)

Richard D. Alba
- Born: December 22, 1942; New York City, U.S.
- Died: June 4, 2025 (aged 82)

Academic background
- Education: Columbia University (Ph.D., 1974)
- Thesis: Assimilation Among American Catholics (1974)

Academic work
- Discipline: Sociologist
- Sub-discipline: Immigration specialist
- Institutions: CUNY Graduate Center, University at Albany, SUNY
- Notable students: Min Zhou

Richard Denis Alba (December 22, 1942 – June 4, 2025) was an American sociologist and professor at the Graduate Center, CUNY and at the sociology department at the University at Albany, SUNY, where he founded the University at Albany's Center for Social and Demographic Analysis (CSDA). He was known for developing assimilation theory to fit the contemporary, multi-racial era of immigration, with studies in America, France and Germany. In 2020 he was elected to the National Academy of Sciences.

Alba grew up in New York City, where he attended the Bronx High School of Science, followed by undergraduate and graduate training at Columbia University, where he earned his B.A. in 1963 and Ph.D. in 1974.

Alba's text on cultural assimilation theory (written with Victor Nee), Remaking the American Mainstream (2003) won the Thomas & Znaniecki Award of the American Sociological Association and the Eastern Sociological Society’s Mirra Komarovsky Award. It was the 36th most-cited work in sociology between 2008 and 2012.

Alba also wrote about the historical realities of assimilation, using Italian Americans to exemplify them. His book, Ethnic Identity: The Transformation of White America (1990), summarizes his thinking on the assimilation of the so-called white ethnics. His Blurring the Color Line: The New Chance for a More Integrated America (2009) applied these ideas to non-white Americans.

In 2001 Alba was elected vice president of the American Sociological Association. In 1997 and 1998 he was president of the Eastern Sociological Society.

From 2012 to 2013, Alba was president of the Sociological Research Association. He received the Distinguished Career Award from the International Migration section of the American Sociological Association and the Merit Award of the Eastern Sociological Society. He was awarded a John Simon Guggenheim Fellowship, two Fulbright grants, and fellowships from the German Marshall Fund, and the Russell Sage Foundation. He was a fellow of the Radcliffe Institute.

Alba died on June 4, 2025, at the age of 82.

== Bibliography ==
- Alba, Richard (1984). Italian Americans: Into the Twilight of Ethnicity. Englewood Cliffs: Prentice Hall. ISBN 0135066689.
- Alba, Richard (1990). Ethnic Identity: The Transformation of White America. New Haven: Yale University Press. ISBN 0300052219. OCLC 20932804.
- Alba, Richard; Nee, Victor (2003). Remaking the American Mainstream: Assimilation and Contemporary Immigration. Cambridge: Harvard University Press. ISBN 0674018133. OCLC 51222215.
- Alba, Richard (2012). Blurring the Color Line: The New Chance for a More Integrated America. Cambridge: Harvard University Press. ISBN 978-0674064706. OCLC 316037974.
- Alba, Richard; Foner, Nancy (2015). Strangers No More: Immigration and the Challenges of Integration in North America and Western Europe. Princeton: Princeton University Press. ISBN 978-0691176208. OCLC 894625313.
- Alba, Richard (2020). The Great Demographic Illusion: Majority, Minority, and the Expanding American Mainstream. Princeton: Princeton University Press. ISBN 9780691201634. OCLC 1145922390.
