= Religious assimilation =

Adoption of a dominant culture's religion

Religious assimilation refers to the adoption of a majority or dominant culture's religious practices and beliefs by a minority or subordinate culture. It is an important form of cultural assimilation.

Religious assimilation includes the religious conversion of individuals from a minority faith to the dominant faith. It can also include the religious indoctrination of children into a dominant religion by their converted parents. However, religious assimilation need not involve wholesale adoption of a dominant religious belief system by a minority; the concept is broad enough to include alterations in the frequency of religious participation to match that of the dominant culture. Indeed, religious assimilation among immigrant groups most commonly involves such minor changes, rather than sweeping change in religious belief systems.

== Forms of religious assimilation ==
=== Gradual changes ===
In sharp contrast to other aspects of cultural assimilation such as language and nationality, dominant cultures in general tend not to expect immigrants to adopt the dominant religion. Some researchers, such as Will Herberg, have advanced a thesis of perpetual religious pluralism, to the effect that immigrants their religious affiliation even after complete cultural assimilation in other aspects of culture. Still, even those who retain their religion are still likely to become less religious over time as a result of assimilation, Herberg says. After a generation or two, formerly devout families may see their original religious identity develop into something more surface-level or symbolic.

=== In response to pressure and/or persecution ===
Some dominant cultures may exert pressures for religious assimilation so extreme as to amount, according to some researchers, to a form of religious persecution. These pressures may be exerted by making other, more appealing forms of cultural assimilation, such as membership in secular social club activities, so time-consuming that they interfere seriously with attendance at minority religious services, and by discouraging expression of minority religious beliefs in public.

Some examples of this form of religious assimilation can be found throughout Jewish history. In the late 1300s, antisemitic violence forced many Spanish Jews to convert or leave. Then, in 1492, Spain officially ordered the Jewish population of Spain to convert to Catholicism or leave. While some Spanish Jews did leave, others stayed. Those who stayed had to convert, but not all of those who converted fully adopted Catholicism; many of these continued to practice Judaism in secrecy, becoming known as "crypto-Jews." Others converted and began gradually adopting Catholicism over subsequent generations.

== See also ==
- Exclusivism
- Syncretism
