= Growing Up American =

Growing Up American: How Vietnamese Children Adapt to Life in the United States
- Author: Min Zhou, Carl L. Bankston
- Language: English
- Genre: Non-fiction
- Publisher: Russell Sage Foundation
- Publication date: 1998
- Publication place: United States

Growing Up American: How Vietnamese Children Adapt to Life in the United States, by Min Zhou and Carl L. Bankston III is one of the most influential books on the Vietnamese American experience. Published in 1998 by the Russell Sage Foundation, it is widely used in college classes on international migration, contemporary American history, and Asian Studies. The book emphasizes the role of Vietnamese communities in promoting the adaptation of Vietnamese American young people.

One of the unique characteristics of the book is its combination of a general history of the growth and nature of Vietnamese American communities around the United States with an in-depth study of one specific Vietnamese community, on the eastern edge of New Orleans, Louisiana.

== Organization of the book ==
Chapter 1 traces the history of Vietnamese settlement in the United States, giving special attention to how the process of refugee resettlement and popular opinions of the American public have influenced Vietnamese American children. Chapter 2 gives a description of the demographic and socioeconomic characteristics of the U.S. Vietnamese population and describes the social and economic challenges facing the Vietnamese. Chapter 3 offers examples of how families and surrounding ethnic communities can serve as sources of social capital for young people. Chapter 4 discusses the patterns of social and kinship relations in Vietnamese ethnic communities. Here, Zhou and Bankston develop their theory that ethnic social relations can serve as a form of social capital for young people growing up in immigrant communities. Chapter 5 examines how Vietnamese language abilities promote the adaptation of young Vietnamese to American society by connecting them to the supports of their families and communities. Chapter 6 considers Vietnamese American adaptation to American schools and argues that generally high levels of school performance are products of tightly integrated ethnic communities. Chapter 7 examines bicultural conflict and gender role issues faced by Vietnamese growing up in the United States. Chapter 8 discusses peer group associations and problems of juvenile delinquency. It provides evidence that young people who follow delinquent patterns tend to be those who assimilate to the youth culture of Vietnamese and other subgroups, rather than remain bound within their ethnic communities. Chapter 9 gives a general summary and offers conclusions of relevance to the study of immigrant and minority groups in the United States.

== Critical reception ==
Growing Up American has received widespread critical praise. Writing in the journal Social Forces, reviewer Jiannbin Shiao described the analysis of delinquency in the Vietnamese community as “contestable but refreshingly bold” and described it as “a fine contribution to the sociology of education, social stratification, social demography, Asian American Studies, and, one hopes, also U.S. urban policy.” In the International Migration Review, Kimberly Goyette praised the book for “…elaborat[ing] a detailed and elegant framework for conceptualizing the relationship between children and their various environments and also the relationship between these environments.” Kelly Chong, reviewing the book for the American Journal of Sociology, observed “this comprehensive investigation of the adaptation process of second generation Vietnamese in the United States fills an important gap in the study of contemporary “new” immigrants and the second generation assimilation experience.”

In addition to the praise, though, reviewers have also had some reservations. In particular, critics have questioned the generalizability of the books findings to other ethnic groups and they have suggested the book may be too optimistic in its account of the future of young Vietnamese Americans. Critics of more radical orientations have often objected the authors’ acceptance of American society and the focus on adapting to that society. For example, Karin Aguilar-San Juan, in the book Little Saigons: Staying Vietnamese in America, accuses Zhou and Bankston of ignoring the processes of racialization and systemic racism in encouraging Asian immigrant achievement while frustrating black American achievement.

== Awards ==
- 1999 Thomas and Znaniecki Award, Outstanding Book in International Migration, American Sociological Association
- 2000 Distinguished Book Award, Mid-South Sociological Association

== See also ==
- Asian American
- Diaspora studies
- List of U.S. cities with large Vietnamese American populations
- List of Vietnamese Americans
- Little Saigon
- Overseas Vietnamese
- Refugees
- Vietnamese people
