= Immigrant-host model =

The immigrant-host model was an approach that developed in postwar sociology to explain the new patterns of immigration and racism. It explained the racism of hosts as a reaction to the different cultural traditions of the immigrants, which acted as obstacles for their economic development and social integration. The model assumed that the disruption immigration caused to stability would be solved by the cultural assimilation of immigrants into the dominant culture. Since the 1970s, however, the assumptions in this model have been increasingly discarded in the sociology of race relations. The core idea of the model that the immigrants' children would gradually assimilate and, thus, that racism and racial inequality would cease proved false. The model was criticized and blamed for reflecting and, even, reinforcing the racist assumptions by describing the cultures of immigrants as social problems and ignoring the role structural inequality plays in their subjugation.
