= Victor G. Nee =

American sociologist (born 1945)

- Born: 1945 (age 80–81)
- Education: Harvard University (M.A. and Ph.D. in Sociology)
- Known for: Study of the rise of capitalism in China
- Spouse: Brett de Bary Nee
- Awards: Guggenheim Fellowship (2007)
- Scientific career
- Fields: Sociology; Economic sociology
- Workplaces: University of California, Santa Barbara; Cornell University

Victor G. Nee (born 1945) is an American sociologist and professor at Cornell University, known for his work in economic sociology, inequality and immigration. He published a book with Richard Alba entitled Remaking the American Mainstream proposing a neo-assimilation theory to explain the assimilation of post-1965 immigrant minorities and the second generation.

In 2012, he published Capitalism from Below co-authored with Sonja Opper examining the rise of economic institutions of capitalism in China. Nee is the Frank and Rosa Rhodes Professor, and Director of the Center for the Study of Economy and Society at Cornell University. Nee received the John Simon Guggenheim Fellowship in 2007, and has been a visiting fellow at the Russell Sage Foundation in New York ( 1994–1995), and the Center for Advanced Study in the Behavioral Sciences at Stanford University (1996–1997). He was awarded an honorary doctorate in economics by Lund University in Sweden in 2013.

== Biography ==
Nee studied at the University of California, Los Angeles, and the University of California, Santa Cruz where he obtained a BA in 1967. He received an MA in East Asian Studies from Harvard University and was a co-founder of the Committee of Concerned Asian Scholars—a group of faculty and graduate students who opposed America's intervention in Vietnam. As a graduate student in sociology, he wrote with his wife Brett de Bary (daughter of Sinologist Wm. Theodore de Bary), Longtime Californ': A Documentary Study of an American Chinatown published by Pantheon Books which was selected by The New York Times as one of the 10 best books in 1974. He later returned to Harvard University to complete his dissertation in sociology, receiving an MA in 1975 and a PhD in 1977.

Nee was an assistant and associate professor of sociology at the University of California, Santa Barbara from 1977 to 1985. He joined the tenured faculty of the Department of Sociology at Cornell University in 1985 and held the Goldwin Smith Professor of Sociology from 1991 to 2011. He was chair of the Department of Sociology from 1997 to 2002, and was the founding director of the Center for the Study of Economy and Society from 2001 to 2018. In 2011, he was appointed the Frank and Rosa Rhodes Professor of Economic Sociology at Cornell University. In 2012, he was Global Professor of Social Research and Public Policy at New York University, Abu Dhabi. He was elected in 2016 to serve as the president of the Eastern Sociological Society.

Nee received various honors and awards, including a Fellowship from the American Council of Learned Societies and Social Science Research Council (1990–1991), and the John Simon Guggenheim Fellowship in 2007. He was a Fellow at Center for Advanced Study in the Behavioral Sciences (1996–1997). In 2020 he was elected to the American Academy of Arts and Sciences. He has also received an honorary doctorate in economics from Lund University, Sweden.

== Work ==
Nee's research interests focus on middle range theories and their confirmation in economic sociology, new institutionalism, inequality and immigration. One of his contributions in the New Institutionalism in Sociology (1998) advances a networks-and-institutions approach. This and subsequent articles further an understanding of how norms and networks, and formal institutional elements combine and recombine to shape organizational action and economic performance.

Nee contributed influential theories explaining a variety of macro-societal phenomena. He developed market transition theory, which launched a broad research program and debate on the interplay between market transition and change in the mechanisms of stratification. His book Capitalism from Below: Markets and Institutional Change in China co-authored with Sonja Opper (Harvard University Press 2012) explains the rise of dynamic capitalism in China. The book examines the emergence of new organizational and institutional forms, detailing how norms and networks promote economic performance in the absence of good government policies and formal institutions.

In his book Remaking the American Mainstream, co-authored with Richard Alba (Harvard University Press 2003) he advances a neo-assimilation theory explaining the cumulative inclusion of post-1965 immigrants and their children in the institutional mainstream of American economy and society. The book compares the late European and new immigration from Latin America and Asia to the United States.

== Selected works ==
=== Articles and chapters ===
- "On Politicized Capitalism" (with Sonja Opper) in On Capitalism, edited by Victor Nee and Richard Swedberg, Stanford University Press, 2007.
- “The New Institutionalism in Economics and Sociology.” In The Handbook of Economic Sociology (2nd ed.) edited by Neil Smelser and Richard Swedberg. Princeton: Princeton University Press, 2005.
- "Path Dependent Societal Transformation: Stratification in Mixed Economies" (with Yang Cao). Theory and Society 28 (1999): 799–834.
- "Norms and Networks in Economic and Organizational Performance." American Economic Review Vol. 87 (1998), No. 4, pp. 85–89.
- "Embeddedness and Beyond: Institutions, Exchange and Social Structure" (with Paul Ingram). In The New Institutionalism in Sociology, edited by Mary Brinton and Victor Nee. New York: Russell Sage Foundation, 1998.
- "Rethinking Assimilation Theory for a New Era of Immigration" (with Richard Alba). International Migration Review (1997): 826–974.
- "Immigrant Self-Employment: The Family as Social Capital and the Value of Human Capital" (with Jimy Sanders). American Sociological Review 60 (1996):231-250.
- "The Emergence of a Market Society: Changing Mechanisms of Stratification in China." American Journal of Sociology 100 (1996): 908–949.
- "Job Transitions in an Immigrant Metropolis: Ethnic Boundaries and Mixed Economy" (with Jimy M. Sanders and Scott Sernau). American Sociological Review 59 (1994): 849–872.
- "Organizational Dynamics of Market Transition: Hybrid Forms, Property Rights, and Mixed Economy in China." American Sociological Review 56 (1991): 267–282.
- "Social Inequalities in Reforming State Socialism: Between Redistribution and Markets in China." American Sociological Review 56 (1991): 267–282.
- "A Theory of Market Transition: From Redistribution to Markets in State Socialism." American Sociological Review 54 (1989): 663–681.

=== Books ===
- with Sonja Opper, Capitalism from Below: Markets and Institutional Change in China (Cambridge, MA: Harvard University Press, 2012)
- On Capitalism, Co-editor and contributor with Richard Swedberg (Stanford: Stanford University Press, 2007)
- The Economic Sociology of Capitalism. Co-editor and contributor with Richard Swedberg (Princeton: Princeton University Press, 2005).
- Remaking the American Mainstream: Assimilation and the New Immigration (Cambridge, MA: Harvard University Press, 2003).
- The New Institutionalism in Sociology, coeditor and contributor with Mary Brinton (New York: Russell Sage Foundation, 1998).
- with Brett de Bary Nee, Longtime Californ': A Documentary Study of an American Chinatown (New York,: Pantheon Books, 1973).
