= Carl L. Bankston =

American sociologist

- Born: August 8, 1952 (age 74); New Orleans, Louisiana, U.S.
- Education: Southern Methodist University, University of California, Berkeley

Carl L. Bankston III (born August 8, 1952) is an American sociologist, author and educator. He is best known for his work on immigration to the United States, particularly on the adaptation of Vietnamese American immigrants, and for his work on ethnicity, social capital, sociology of religion and the sociology of education.

== Life ==
Carl L. Bankston III was born on August 8, 1952, in New Orleans, Louisiana. Bankston grew up in the New Orleans area. He earned a B.S. from Southern Methodist University in Dallas, Texas at the end of 1974 or the beginning of 1975 and then moved to the San Francisco Bay Area. He completed an M.A. in history at the University of California, Berkeley in 1980 or 1981.

He entered the Peace Corps in 1983 and went to Thailand, where he taught English. Immediately after returning from Thailand, in the Spring of 1985, he took a position as a supervisor of teachers at the Philippine refugee processing center on the Bataan Peninsula. There, he helped to prepare refugees from Vietnam, Cambodia, and Laos for resettlement in the United States.

At the end of 1989, Bankston returned to Louisiana from the Philippines. For a few months, he taught Vietnamese American refugees in New Orleans. He began working on a Ph.D. in sociology at Louisiana State University in the Fall of 1990.

He finished his degree in 1995 and became an assistant professor of sociology at the University of Southwestern Louisiana (now the University of Louisiana at Lafayette). In 1999, he became assistant professor of sociology at Tulane University. He became an associate professor at Tulane in 2002 and a full professor in 2003.

Bankston became co-director of Tulane University's Asian Studies Program in 2002. He became chair of Tulane University's Department of Sociology in 2006.

He has been active in a number of professional organizations, including the American Sociological Association, the Southern Sociological Society, and the Mid-South Sociological Association. He served as vice-president of the Mid-South Sociological Association in from 2003 to 2004. He was elected president of the Mid-South Sociological Association for the year 2007.

== Awards ==
- Bankston's second book, Growing Up American: How Vietnamese Children Adapt to Life in the United States, co-authored with Min Zhou, was widely recognized as one of the most important works on American immigration of the late 1990s. The International Migration Section of the American Sociological Association gave it the Thomas and Znaniecki Award for outstanding book on migration in 1999. In 2000, the book received the Distinguished Book Award of the Mid-South Sociological Association.
- His 2002 book, A Troubled Dream: The Promise and Failure of School Desegregation in Louisiana, co-authored by Stephen J. Caldas, won the 2003 Annual Literary Award of the Louisiana Library Association for best book on Louisiana published in 2002. The book was also featured at the Louisiana Book Festival in Baton Rouge in 2003 and it was the subject of an “author meets critics” session of the Southwestern Social Sciences Association in San Antonio in 2003.
- Bankston won another award for a book published with Stephen J. Caldas, the 2007 Stanford M. Lyman Distinguished Book Award for Forced to Fail: The Paradox of School Desegregation (Praeger, 2005).
- Another book published in 2002, Blue Collar Bayou: Louisiana Cajuns in the New Economy of Ethnicity, won the 2005 Stanford M. Lyman Distinguished Book
- Bankston has also received recognition for his presented and published work. He won the 1999 award for outstanding paper from the Louisiana Education Research Association and the 2001 Award for outstanding paper from the Southwest Education Research Association. His article, Bayou Lotus: Theravada Buddhism in Southwestern Louisiana received the award for outstanding published article of 2000 from the journal Sociological Spectrum.

== Bibliography ==
=== Books as author ===
- Science, Technology, and Society in the Third World by Wesley Shrum, Carl L. Bankston III, and D. Stephen Voss (1995).
- Growing Up American: How Vietnamese Children Adapt to Life in the United States by Min Zhou and Carl L. Bankston III (1998)
- Straddling Two Social Worlds: The Experience of Vietnamese Refugee Children in the United States by Min Zhou and Carl L. Bankston III (2000)
- A Troubled Dream: The Promise and Failure of School Desegregation in Louisiana by Carl L. Bankston III and Stephen J. Caldas (2002).
- Blue Collar Bayou: Louisiana Cajuns in the New Economy of Ethnicity by Jacques M. Henry and Carl L. Bankston III (2002).
- Forced to Fail: The Paradox of School Desegregation by Stephen J. Caldas and Carl L. Bankston III (2005).
- Public Education, America's Civil Religion: A Social History by Carl L. Bankston III and Stephen J. Caldas (2009).

=== Books as editor ===
- "Encyclopedia of Family Life" (5 vols.) edited by Carl L. Bankston III and R. Kent Rasmussen (1998). ISBN 0-89356-940-2.
- Racial and Ethnic Relations (3 vols.) edited by Carl L. Bankston III and others (1999)
- "Sociology Basics" (2 vols.) edited by Carl L. Bankston III (2000)
- "The End of Desegregation?" edited by Stephen J. Caldas and Carl L. Bankston III (2003)
- "World Conflicts: Asia and the Middle East" edited by Carl L. Bankston III (2003)
- "African American History" edited by Carl L. Bankston III (2003)
- "Immigration in U.S. History" edited by Carl L. Bankston III and Danielle Antoinette Hidalgo (2006)

== See also ==
- American Sociological Association
- Social Capital
- Cajun
