= Galang =

Galang may refer to:

- "Galang" (song), a song by M.I.A. from Arular
- Galang (surname), a Filipino surname that means "Respect"
- Galang (film), a 2022 Indonesian drama film
- Galang Island, Indonesia
- Galang Refugee Camp, a refugee camp that accommodated Indochinese refugees from 1979 to 1996
- Galangal, or Galanga, a member of the ginger family: Zingiberaceae
- Galang, a "tribe" from Survivor: Blood vs. Water

== People with the given name ==
- Galang Rambu Anarki (died 1997), Indonesian folk artist
