= Batam City Condominium =

High-rise building in Batam, Indonesia

- Interactive map of the Batam City Condominium area

Record height
- Preceded by: Planet Holiday Hotel & Residence ^{[a]}

General information
- Status: Completed
- Type: Apartment and hotel
- Architectural style: Modern
- Location: Lubuk Baja, Batam, Riau Islands, Indonesia
- Coordinates: 1.1337521°N 104.0087995°E
- Construction started: 2008
- Completed: 2011
- Opened: 2011

Height
- Architectural: 128 metres (420 ft)

Technical details
- Floor count: 28

Design and construction
- Developer: PT Bangun Megah Semesta

Other information
- Number of rooms: 123 apartment units; 152 hotel rooms

Website
- http://thebcchotels.com/

References
- Note: a. The tallest building status is only apply for Batam area.

Batam City Condominium, also known as BCC, is a 128 metres (420 ft) tall condominium in Lubuk Baja, Batam. Upon its completion in 2011 it became the tallest building in Batam, with 28 floors and overall height of 128 metres (420 ft), surpassing the 22 floors Planet Holiday Hotel & Residence. It was also the tallest building in Sumatra region at the time of its completion, surpassing the 108 metres (354 ft), 28 floors J. W. Marriott Hotel in Medan, North Sumatra.

The building was built on a land of 4,000 square metres (43,000 sq ft). It used 4,500 tons of iron as the material and its piles (foundations) are 35 metres (115 ft) deep. The air conditioning system in the building is centralized. It also has a 3,000 kVA electric generator for backup.

== Facilities ==
BCC has 152 hotel rooms and 123 apartment units. The apartment service on the 1st to the 5th floor is devoted to long stay guests, while units on the 6th floor to the 11th floor are used for residences. Furthermore, rooms on the 12th floor and above are used for hotel services.

== See also ==
- Batam
- List of tallest buildings in Batam
- List of tallest buildings in Indonesia
- Meisterstadt
