= Combol =

Island in Indonesia

Coordinates: 0.85°N 103.87°E

Combol Island (Indonesian: Pulau Combol, pronounced Chombol, formerly Dutch spelling Tjombol) lies in the Riau Archipelago of the Riau Islands Province of Indonesia. The total area of the island is 5,877.02 hectare. It is located 20 km SE of Batam, between the islands of Kepala Jernih, Bulan Island, and Sugi Island. It is separated by the 500 foot wide Mie Strait from Citlim Island.
