= Meisterstadt =

Real estate development in Batam, Riau Islands

- Meisterstadt progress as of June 2019
- Interactive map of Meisterstadt
- Location: Laksamana Bintan Street, Batam Center, Batam, Riau Islands
- Coordinates: 1.1184859°N 104.0453151°E
- Status: Under construction
- Groundbreaking: 27 August 2016
- Estimated completion: Late 2028
- Website: https://meisterstadt.co

Companies
- Contractor: PT PP Construction & Investment (phase 1)
- Developer: Pollux Properties
- Owner: Pollux Properties (51%); Habibie family (49%)

Technical details
- Cost: Rp 15 trillion (US$1 billion)
- Buildings: Meisterstadt A1, A2, A3, A5, A6, A7, A8, A9, Pollux Habibie Financial Center & International Hotel, Pollux Mall Batam Center, Habibie & Po International Hospital, Habibie & Po University, and Meisterstadt Galerie Street Shophouses
- Size: 9 ha

Meisterstadt, also known as Pollux Habibie, is a mixed real estate development at Batam Center, Batam, Riau Islands. The development consists of eleven towers, eight residential tower, a mixed office and hotel building, a hospital, a university with a mall, below the towers and shop-houses with green public spaces, envisioned as an integrated vertical city. It is currently under construction.

Pollux Properties is the main developer of the project along with some locals. The project is also known as Pollux Habibie because the dream and the efforts of B. J. Habibie, the 3rd President of Indonesia, for the island to be the most strategic economic city in Indonesia. The development has a land area of about 9 hectares. If completed, the Pollux Habibie Financial Center & International Hotel in the complex will be the tallest building in Indonesia outside Java Island.

== Etymology ==
The project's name derives from the German word, Meister (master) and Stadt (city). Therefore, Meisterstadt means a high standard city, with its concept explained as "city inside a city".

== History ==
=== Site and planning ===
The site was originally an empty land that located in the city center within the Teluk Tering district in Batam Center area. It is bordered by Citra Batam and Livia Garden housing complexes to the north, Ahmad Yani Street with Batam State Polytechnic across the street to the east, Laksamana Bintan Street to the south, and Mitra Raya and Livia Garden housing complexes to the west.

On 28 September 2013, Habibie announced that a medical complex will be built on the site. He added that the hospital was his wife (Ainun)'s dream and anyone can join to help him to realize the project. Because of its strategic location, Pollux Properties, a Singapore-based property company, was attracted to establish a cooperation with Habibie family to develop the site for public, residential, and commercial use in late 2015. On December 5 of that year, they announced that the cooperation named as the Pollux Habibie International, while the project named as Meisterstadt. It was also stated that the construction of the project in the first phase would start in mid-2016 and would be complete by 2019.

The project was inspired by German integrated city concept. In addition, The site was planned to have an office tower with 100 floors, eight apartment towers with 35-45 floors, a 15-story hospital, a 50-story hotel, a mall, and a university. Around one hundred and twenty shophouses would also build on the site.

=== Construction and dealings ===
The project groundbroke on 27 August 2016. It was attended by Pollux Habibie International commissioner Ilham Akbar Habibie, who also B. J. Habibie's son, and the president commissioner of Pollux Properties Timur Pradopo, who was also the National Police chief from 2010 to 2013. On the groundbreaking ceremony, it was stated that the towers will be "taller than those in Singapore". It also announced that the project will be finished by 2028.

On 30 August 2017, state-owned company PT PP Construction & Investment signed a Rp3 trillion (US$213 million) construction deal with Pollux Properties. It was signed at B.J.Habibie's house in Kuningan, West Java. The contract stated that PP would manage construction process of the first phase which expected to be finished by the end of 2019.

Several other dealings were also made during the construction. On 7 February 2018, a payment deal between Pollux and BNI was reached to help buyers on investing their money into the project. Moreover, on 25 February 2019, a Rp238 billion (US$16 million) joint-venture between the developer and the elevator giant, KONE established. It was announced that KONE will designed the elevator for all towers in the project. In the following year, Pollux made another signing that worth Rp100 billion (US$7 million) with PT. FTN (Fasilitas Telekom Nusantara) on January 22, 2020 to build a fiber optic network on the project.

The construction process of the first phase was on schedule as expected. The first structure to be completed, A1, topped out on 15 January 2019. It then followed by A2 on 5 March and A3 on 10 April, while the last structure of the first phase, A5, topped out on 21 August, all are in the same year. On 27 December 2019, Meisterstadt A1 apartment units began to be handed over to the buyers. However, the project's activities were delayed and slowed down following the spread of COVID-19 pandemic in the country in 2020. The handover process of the A1 tower was able to be resumed on 10 September 2020, while Pollux Habibie Mall was opened on 18 February 2023, about three years later than it was originally intended.

=== Concrete fence incident ===
A heavy rain on the evening of 29 January 2020 caused the collapse of the northern part of the project's concrete fence near the residents' housing. In response, Pollux, along with the city government, immediately reacted by sending and coordinating 75 workers, staff, policemen, and local residents with several heavy vehicles to clean the collapsed fence and compensate for the loss of the affected residents. There were no fatalities in this incident and only 1 was injured. It also damaged 10 houses directly.

According to some local residents, their houses have been flooded several times before due to improper drainage system surrounding the project. Some local residents' attempts to talk with the project's consultant regarding the issue were also stalled. City officials also began to question the developer's ability to manage the drainage after the incident. Because of that, the developer promised to rebuild the project's drainage and concrete fence with the better and bigger system, which would be in accordance with AMDAL standard. However, the flood occurred again after another rain in late August 2020. This was due to small holes in the new concrete fence, which caused the water to flow from the project to the lower residential area.

=== Others ===
After the death of B. J. Habibie on 11 September 2019, the project received hundreds of wreaths filled with condolences by the public for the country's third president. Works on the site were stopped for one day to mark his death. Apart from that, the developer stated that they deeply mourned the president death, and in order to pay tribute to his legacy, they promised to finish the project and continue to innovate to realize his dreams. In memory of the president, Po Sun Kok, the President Commissioner of Pollux Properti Indonesia, which developed the project said:

I still remember, when I first met the deceased [B. J. Habibie]. We both have the same dream about Batam. One thing that I remember most is the ambition and belief of the deceased to make Indonesia the 7th richest country according to The CountryMasterplan Development in 2030.

== Phase 1 ==
The phase 1 of the project, which was completed in late 2019, consists of 4 residential towers (A1, A2, A3, and A5) and 113 shop-houses. The A5 tower, named the Erlesen Luxury Penthouse Residence Tower, is the most exclusive residence of the project, containing just 385 apartment units.

== Phase 2 ==
The phase 2 will begin construction after phase 1 has been completed.

== Ownership ==
Under the terms of their agreements with the Habibie's family, Pollux Properties retain 51 per cent of the stakes, while the family own 49 per cent. In this case, Pollux is responsible for the construction of the project, while the Habibie's family acts as the land provider. Therefore, the company developed the project under the name of Pollux Habibie International as a form of cooperation with them.

== See also ==
- Barelang Bridge
- List of tallest buildings in Batam
- List of tallest buildings in Indonesia
