= Galang Refugee Camp =

Refugee camp in Indonesia from 1979 to 1996

Coordinates: 0.7693783°N 104.1912607°E

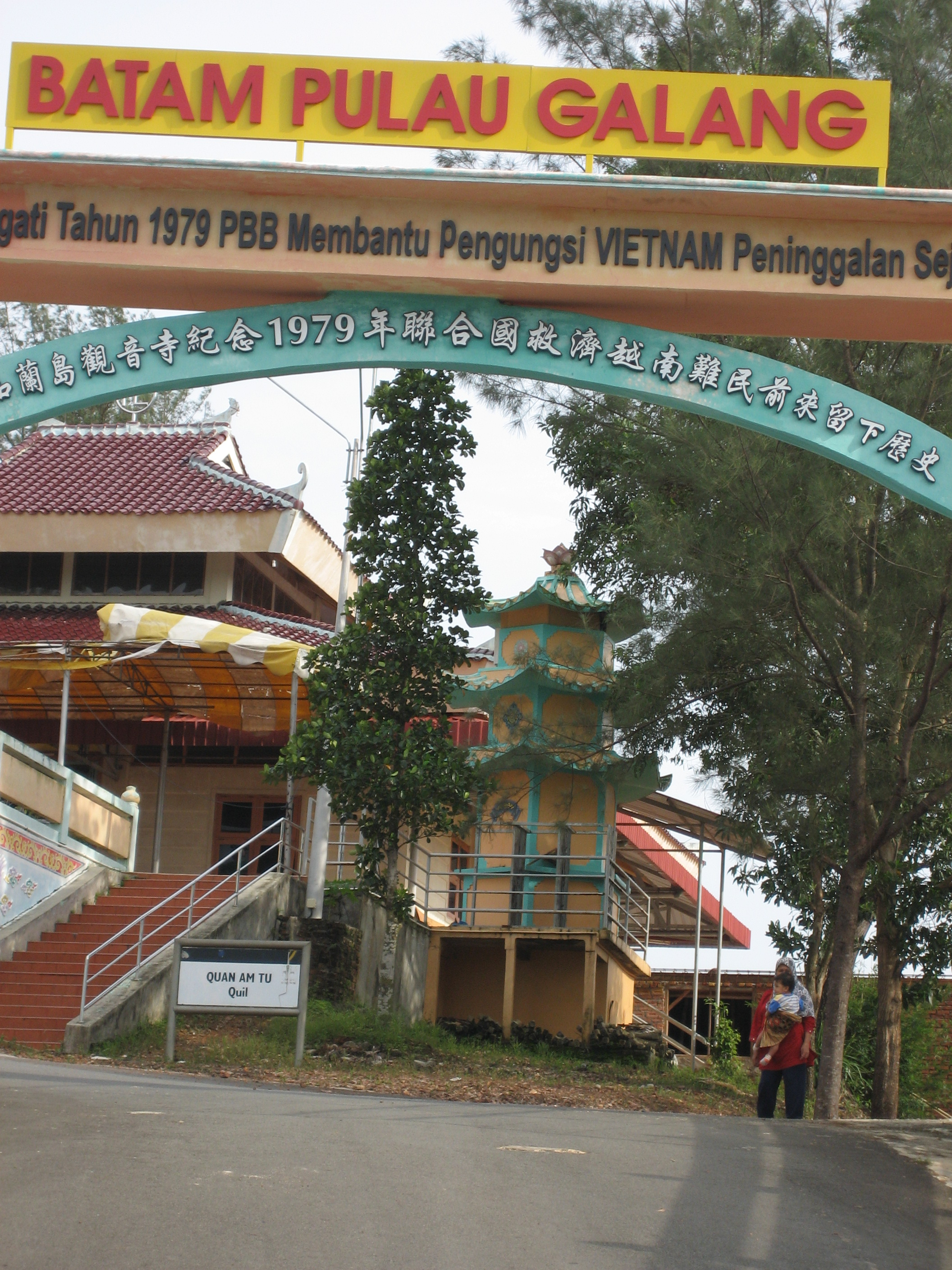
Gate to Galang Refugee Camp

Galang Refugee Camp (Indonesian: Kamp pengungsi Galang) accommodated Indochinese refugees from 1979 to 1996 on Galang Island in the Riau Islands of Indonesia. It is estimated that around 250,000 refugees passed through Galang during this period.

== Organization ==
Galang camp had two sections.

- Camp One was for newly arrived refugees, who had not yet been approved for resettlement in the United States or another third country settlement.
- After approval, refugees were relocated to Camp Two, where they received instructions in English as well as cultural information regarding life in the main resettlement countries. Camp Two also housed Cambodians who had been camped and approved in Thailand, which caused some tensions and unpleasantness with the Vietnamese majority.

Policing was provided by the Indonesian police, while caseworkers and legal officers from participating countries and the United Nations came in on a less regular basis as needed. Relations between the internees and Indonesian police supervisors were not always easy. From time to time there were reports of considerable friction over social and administrative conditions in the camp.

== Host countries ==
The largest refugee movements were to the United States and Canada. Australia took a significant number, and was sometimes preferred by refugees with American family because Australia had shorter waiting periods and less red tape. Australia also took professionals with special skills, while the United States focused on family reunification, in keeping with its overall immigration and national vision. Denmark and Switzerland occasionally took refugees with special health needs for which their governments had infrastructure. Japan and Germany provided money and material.

An independent German charitable organization ran a boat, the 'Cap Anamur', which rescued refugees floundering at sea; Germany (then the Federal Republic of, or West, Germany) accepted these individuals for resettlement, but with strict limitations on family reunification. This put some Galang refugees in the difficult emotional situation of rejoicing to learn that a loved one had been saved at sea—even while being informed that the family member would not be able to live in the same country for many years.

== Arrangements in the camp ==
Many individuals and families lived long periods of time in one or both of the camps at Galang. Babies were born, and some people died, although there was a basic but adequate hospital. Of special note were the many young single men, mostly Vietnamese, who had emigrated to establish a better life for their families. Not only were they trapped with nothing to do but women were in short supply and usually enjoyed family protection. The protection of young women in the camps, particularly, was a difficult issue for the UNHCR staff whose job included monitoring social conditions in the camp. There were many reports of ill-treatment of young women in the camp.

Nevertheless, many refugees established such amenities as gardens and coffee houses. Informal social networks provided some degree of support, especially for women. The more fortunate in the camp were able to trade items sent to them by family or friends from outside. Despite such apparent comforts, the boredom and uncertainty, as well as normal rivalries and tensions common to any small town, put an undertone of unhappiness into camp life. In an attempt to alleviate this feeling, many refugees would look for creative ways to spend their leisure time. One such man, Minh Tran, is recorded to have made a chess set out of plastic rubbish found within the camp. Disturbances occurred within the camp from time to time, and in 1994 there was prolonged rioting amongst discontented detainees.

Refugees left the camp after they had been assigned locations for resettlement and sponsors had agreed to provide financial assistance. Upon approval, the refugees gathered at the dock clutching plastic bags with their few possessions. First, usually at night, they boarded a ferry boat to Singapore. For many, particularly Cambodians, when the modern skyline came into view, exuberation gave way to apprehension. For those who had never flown, concern about the new country was amplified by concern about the airplanes. For others, the time in Singapore was a pleasant reminder of urban pleasures once enjoyed and soon to be restored. After a day or two in the small Singapore camp, the emigres were loaded onto planes chartered by ICM (International Committee for Migration) for the flight to Oakland, California or other destinations.

== History ==
Galang camp was closed in 1996 seven years after the Comprehensive Plan of Action for Indo-Chinese Refugees was adopted. All the Vietnamese refugees had been repatriated by the UNHCR. The transfer of the camp (technically, "Sinam Camp") from the UNHCR to the Indonesian Batam Industrial Development Authority (BIDA) took place officially in 1997. Most boat people who arrived in Galang were transferred from other islands like Natuna, Tarempa, Anambas.

Galang camp had many facilities and offices such as a camp administration office, PMI (Palang Merah Indonesia or Indonesian Red Cross Hospital) and UNHCR offices/staff premises. Many non-government organisations such as Save the Children and Écoles Sans Frontières also operated schools in the camp. Most refugees stayed in wooden long houses or makeshift accommodation. Their main activities in the camp were to study English and other languages, or learn vocational skills, while waiting for the results of their applications to determine their refugees status and resettlement in other countries.

Today, Galang Island is managed by the Batam Industrial Development Authority (BIDA). In 1992, according to Presidential Decree No. 28/1992, the expansion of BIDA Working Area included Rempang Island, Galang Island and small islands nearby. BIDA built 6 bridges which were inaugurated on 25 January 1998. The bridges connect Batam Island - Tonton Island - Nipah Island - Setoko Island - Rempang Island - Galang Island - Galang Baru (New Galang) Island in order to develop all these islands.

Indonesia is not a signatory to the 1951 United Nations Convention on Refugees so Indonesia's international legal obligations are somewhat different from countries which have signed the Convention.

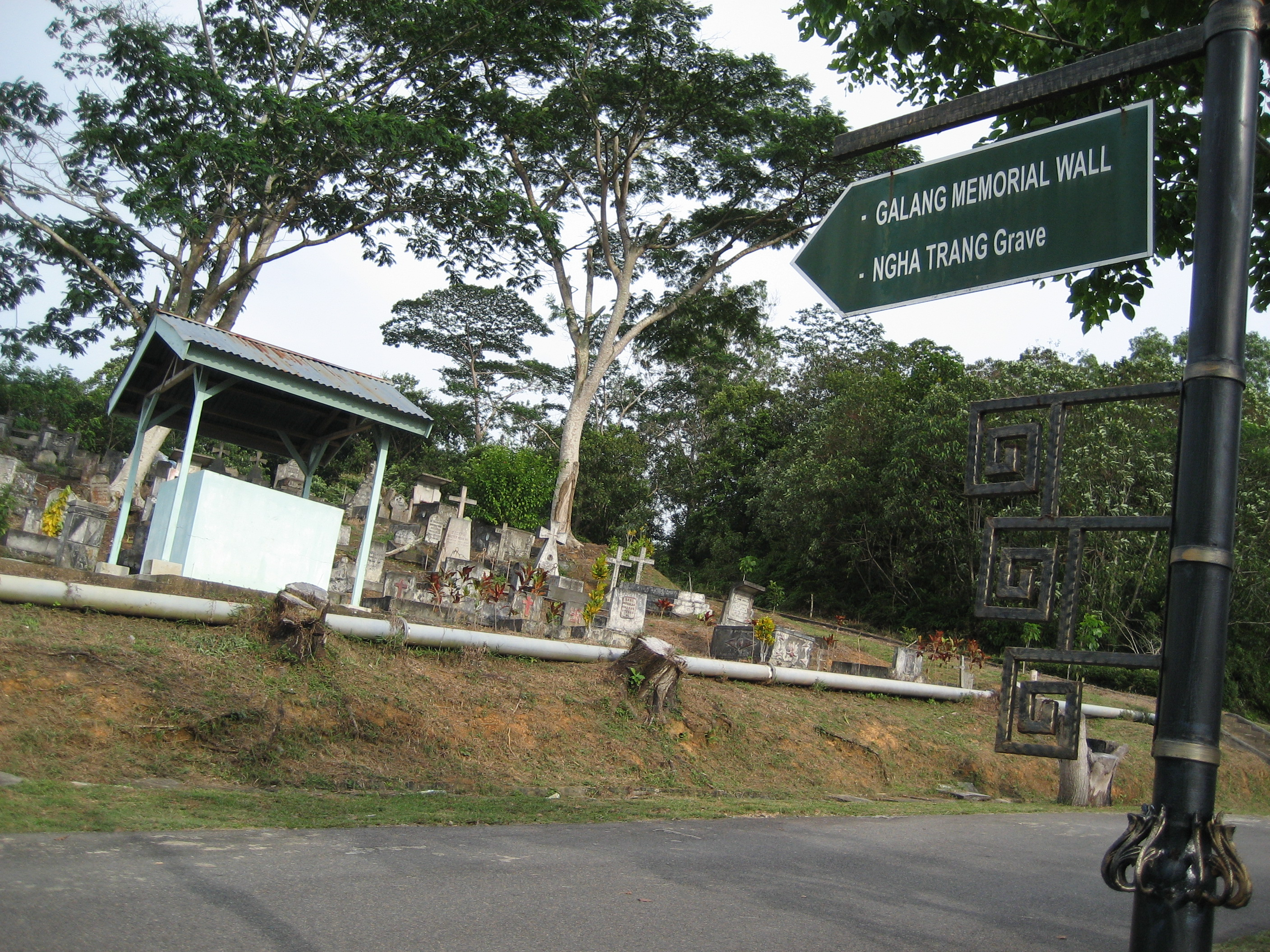
Memorial Wall of Galang Refugee camp

== See also ==
- Philippine refugee processing center (PRPC)
- Indochina refugee crisis
