= List of tallest buildings in Batam =

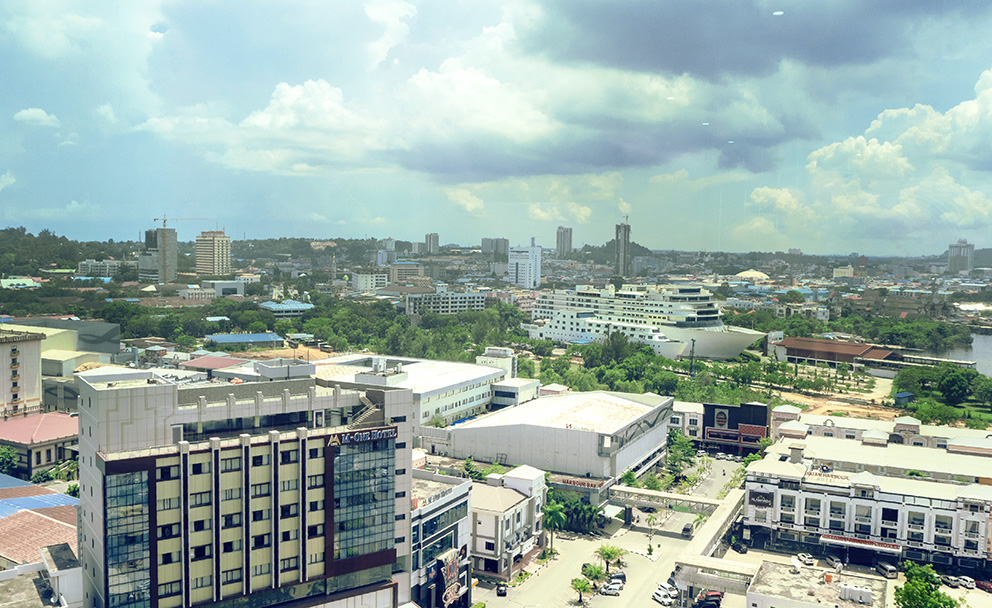
View of Batam skyline from Harbour Bay Downtown

Batam, the largest city in Riau Islands, is home to many high-rise buildings. The current tallest building in the city is the Meisterstadt A5, while the tallest occupied building is Batam City Condominium, which stands 128 metres (420 ft) tall. The majority of the city's high-rises are located in Nagoya neighbourhood. Throughout the 2010s, Batam experienced massive real estate development ranging from high-rise buildings into skyscrapers.

== Tallest completed and topped-out buildings ==
This list is based on The Skyscraper Centre, as of May 2019. This list may also include data from other sources.

- Year : Year of completion
- = : Equal height
  Tallest completed
- Tallest topped out and former tallest

Rank	Name	Image	Height m (ft)	Floors	Year	Usage	Notes
1	Meisterstadt A5	-	~175 metres (574 ft)	44	2020	residential	Current tallest topped out building in Batam; part of Meisterstadt development.
2	Meisterstadt A1	-	~168 metres (551 ft)	42	2019	residential	Part of Meisterstadt development.
=2	Meisterstadt A2	-	~168 metres (551 ft)	42	2019	residential	Part of Meisterstadt development.
=2	Meisterstadt A3	-	~168 metres (551 ft)	42	2019	residential	Part of Meisterstadt development.
3	Formosa Residence	-	~145 metres (476 ft)	36	2019	residential	Topped out.
4	One Residence Batam	-	~132 metres (433 ft)	32	2019	residential	Current tallest completed building in Batam. It surpassed the BCC in 2019.
5	Batam City Condominium	-	128 metres (420 ft)	28	2011	hotel residential	After surpassing Planet Holiday Hotel, it became the tallest completed building in Batam in 2011, before surpassed by the One Residence in 2019.
6	Panbil Residence Apartment	-	~117 metres (384 ft)	25	2017	residential	Completed.
7	Aston Hotel & Residence I	-	~105 metres (344 ft)	22	2017	hotel residential	Part of Aston Hotel & Residence Batam Complex.
8	Planet Holiday Hotel & Residence		~85 metres (279 ft)	20	2004	hotel residential	Tallest building in Batam from 2004 until 2011, when it surpassed by the BCC. It was renovated in 2016.

== Proposed, on hold, and under construction buildings shown ==
This list is based on The Skyscraper Centre, as of May 2019. This list may also include data from other sources.

- Year : Year of estimated completion
- = : Equal height

Rank	Name	Image	Height m (ft)	Floors	Year	Usage	Notes
1	Citra Plaza Nagoya Apartment Tower 1	-	~160 metres (520 ft)	39	2020	residential	Under construction. Part of Citra Plaza Nagoya development.

== See also ==
- List of tallest buildings in Indonesia
