= Planet Holiday Hotel & Residence =

High-rise building in Batam, Indonesia

- Planet Holiday Hotel & Residence
- Interactive map of the Planet Holiday Hotel & Residence area

Record height
- Surpassed by: Batam City Condominium ^{[a]}

General information
- Status: Completed
- Type: Hotel; Residential
- Architectural style: Post-modern
- Location: Sei Jodoh, Batam, Riau Islands, Indonesia
- Coordinates: 1.1519617°N 104.0074017°E
- Completed: 2004
- Opened: September 6, 2003

Height
- Architectural: 85 metres (279 ft)

Technical details
- Floor count: 20

Website
- http://www.planetholidayhotel.com/

References
- Note: a. The tallest building status is only apply for Batam area.

Planet Holiday Hotel & Residence (widely known as Planet Holiday) is an 85 metres (279 ft) tall high-rise building in Sei Jodoh, Batam. At completion in 2004, it became the tallest building in Batam, which held for about 7 years, before being surpassed by Batam City Condominium as the tallest building in Batam in 2011.

== See also ==
- Batam
- List of tallest buildings in Batam
