= Nagoya (disambiguation) =

Nagoya is a Japanese city.

Nagoya may also refer to:

- Nagoya, Batam, Indonesia
- Nagoya Protocol, an instrument of international law on biodiversity
- Nagoya Broadcasting Network, a television station in Aichi Prefecture, Japan

== See also ==
- Nogoyá, Argentina
