= Nongsa =

District in Riau Islands, Indonesia

- District
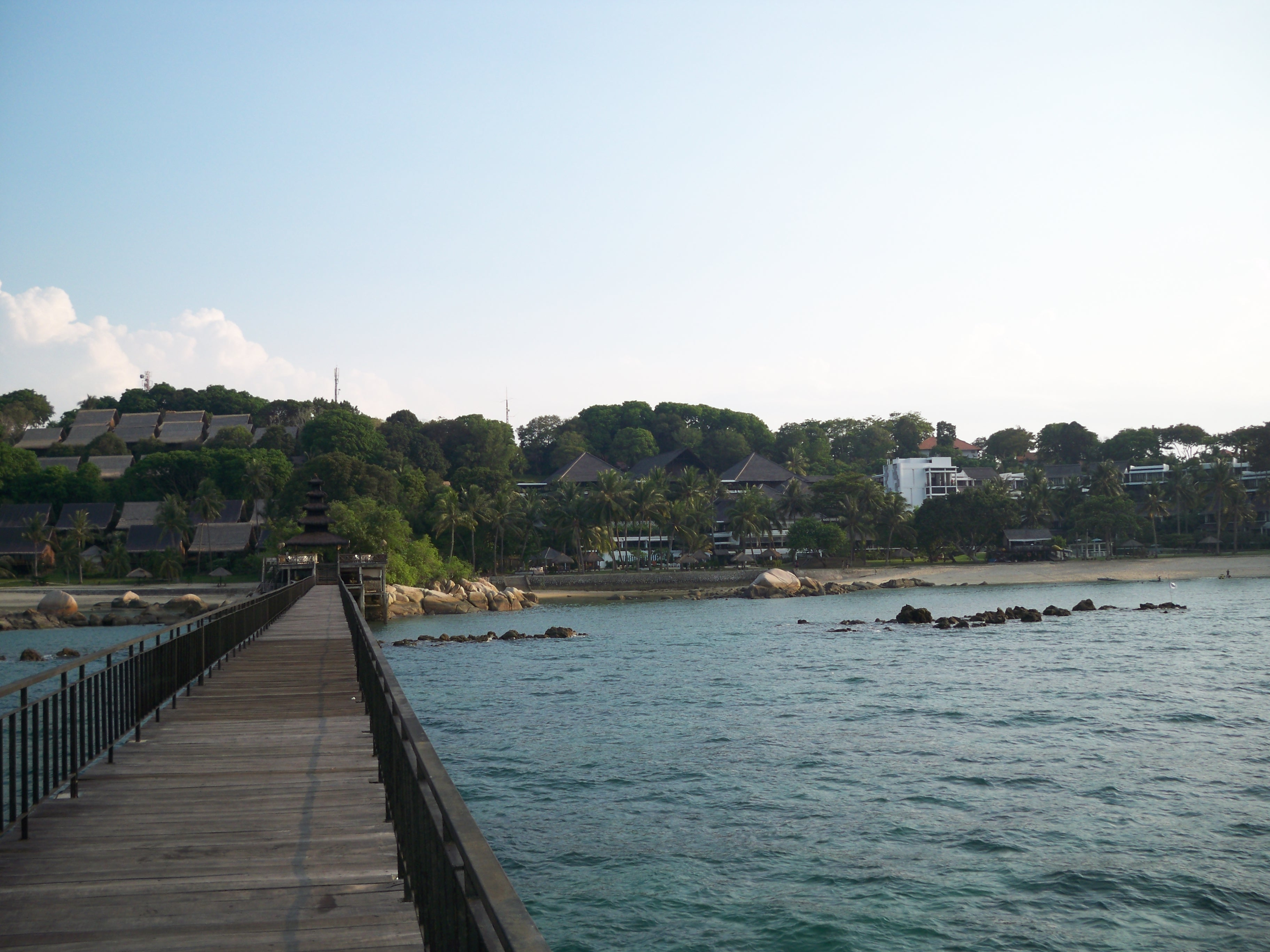
- Turi Beach Resort Hotel at Nongsa Batam
- Interactive map of Nongsa
- Coordinates: 1°4′59.48″N 104°7′15.9622″E
- Country: Indonesia
- Province: Riau Islands
- City: City of Batam

Area
  - Total: 290.36 km^{2} (112.11 sq mi)

Population (mid 2023)
  - Total: 96,037
  - Density: 330.75/km^{2} (856.64/sq mi)
- Time zone: UTC+7 (Western Indonesia Time)
- Postal Code: 29465 - 29468

Nongsa is an administrative district (kecamatan) in Batam, Riau Islands Province, Indonesia.
