= Barelang Bridge =

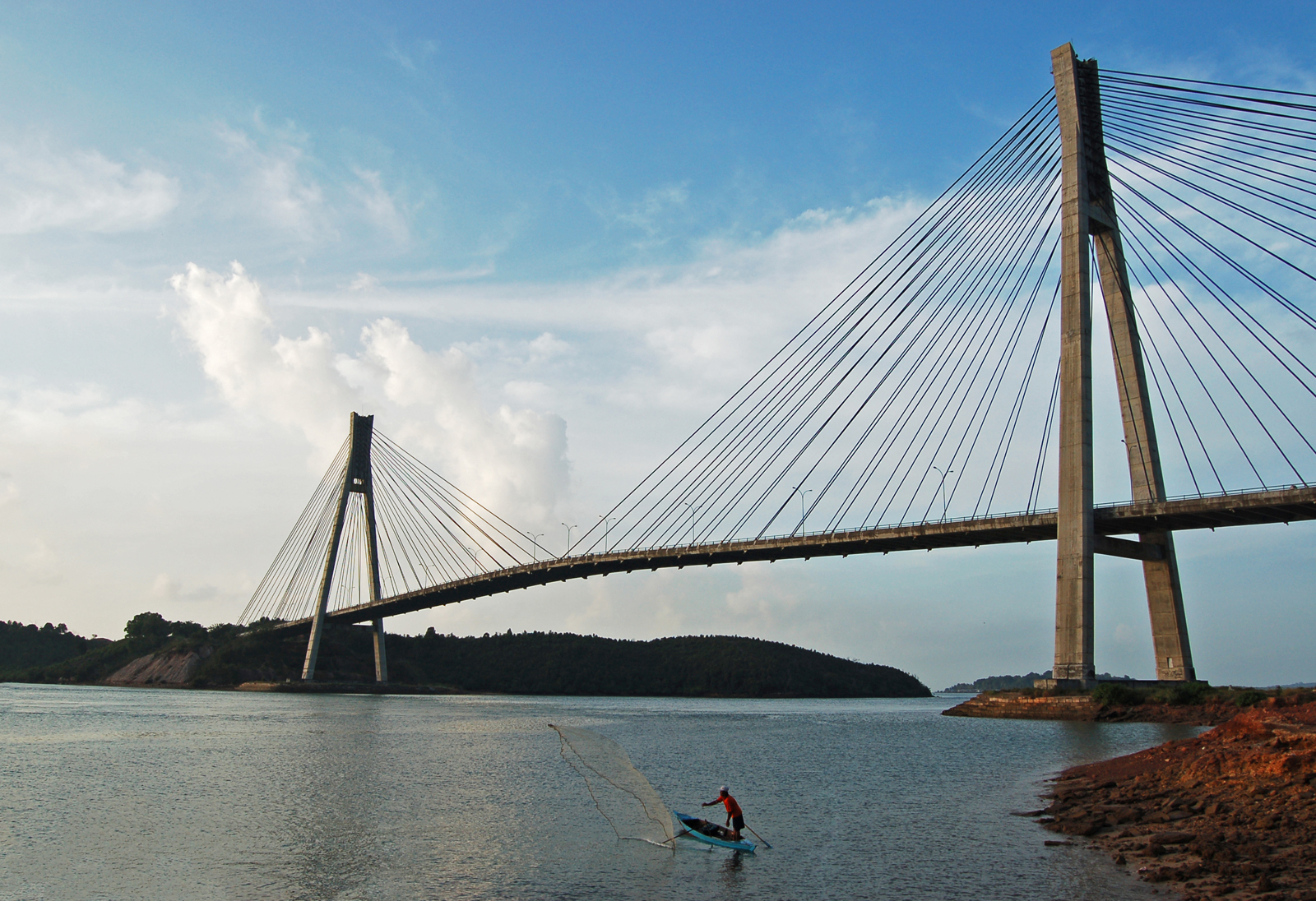
- The cable-stayed Tengku Fisabilillah Bridge 1, connects Batam Island and Tonton Island
- Coordinates: 0°58′54″N 104°2′30″E
- Crosses: South China Sea
- Locale: Batam City, Riau islands
- Begins: Sagulung District, Batam
- Ends: Galang District, Batam
- Maintained by: Riau islands Provincial Government

Characteristics
- Design: cable-stayed bridge
- Total length: Bridge 1 - 642 metres (2,106 ft); Bridge 2 - 420 metres (1,378 ft); Bridge 3 - 270 metres (886 ft); Bridge 4 - 365 metres (1,198 ft); Bridge 5 - 385 metres (1,263 ft); Bridge 6 - 180 metres (591 ft)
- Longest span: Bridge 1 - 350 metres (1,148 ft); Bridge 2 - 160 metres (525 ft); Bridge 3 - 45 metres (148 ft); Bridge 4 - 145 metres (476 ft); Bridge 5 - 245 metres (804 ft)

History
- Construction start: 1992
- Construction end: 1998
- Construction cost: Rp 400 billion

Location
- Interactive map of Barelang Bridge

Barelang Bridge (Indonesian: Jembatan Barelang) is a chain of 6 bridges of various types built in 1997 that connect the Rempang-Galang island group in the Riau Archipelago with the principal island of Batam to its north. The smaller islands of Tonton, Nipah, and Setotok (considered parts of the Batam island group) connect Batam and Rempang, while a further small island - Galang Baru - is connected at the southern end of the chain. The entire Barelang region covers 715 square kilometres (276 sq mi).

Some locals call the bridge Jembatan Habibie after Jusuf Habibie, who oversaw the project in construction, aiming to transform the Rempang and Galang islands into industrial sites (resembling present-day Batam).

The concept design for the 6 bridges were proposed by Bruce Ramsay of VSL. Habibie had requested that the designs should be based on a variation of different structural bridge types, in order to introduce & develop new bridge design & building technologies for the Indonesian market. Over time the bridge sites have grown more into a tourist attraction rather than just a transportation route, and the expected economic benefits have not materialized.

The full stretch of all 6 bridges total to 2 kilometres (1.2 mi). Travelling from the first bridge to the last is about 50 kilometres (31 mi) and takes about 50 minutes. Construction of the bridges started in 1992 and took names from fifteenth to eighteenth-century rulers of the Riau Sultanate.

== Bridges ==
1. Tengku Fisabilillah Bridge, connects Batam and Tonton island. It stretches for 642 metres (2,106 ft) and is the longest of the six, being a cable-stayed bridge with two 118-metre-high (387 ft) pylons and main span 350 metres (1,148 ft).
2. Nara Singa Bridge, a cantilever bridge with total length 420 metres (1,378 ft) and main span 160 metres (525 ft), connects Tonton island with Nipah island.
3. Ali Haji Bridge, a girder bridge with total length 270 metres (886 ft) and main span 45 metres (148 ft), connects Nipah island with Setoko island.
4. Sultan Zainal Abidin Bridge, a cantilever bridge with total length 365 metres (1,198 ft) and main span 145 metres (476 ft), connects Setoko island with Rempang island.
5. Tuanku Tambusai Bridge, an arch bridge with total length 385 metres (1,263 ft) and main span 245 metres (804 ft), connects Rempang island with Galang island The road deck was constructed using the incremental launching method, whereby the deck was constructed on the bridge approach and then launched horizontally by the use of hydraulic jacks with special sliding bearings out over the previously constructed arch.
6. Raja Kecik Bridge, the smallest bridge with a total length of 180 metres (591 ft), connects Galang island with Galang Baru island.

== Gallery ==
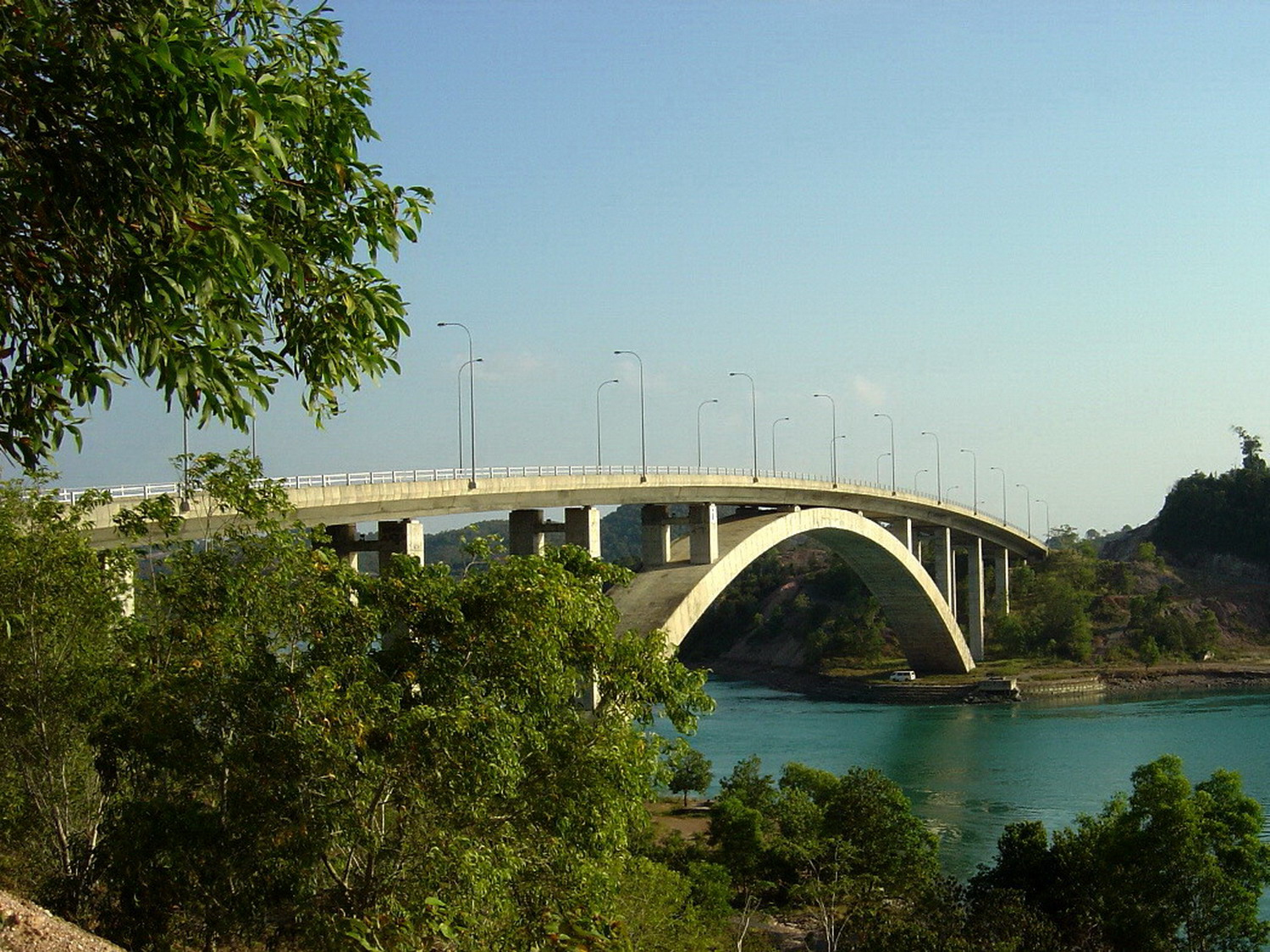
The arch Tuanku Tambusai Bridge 5, connects Rempand and Galang islands

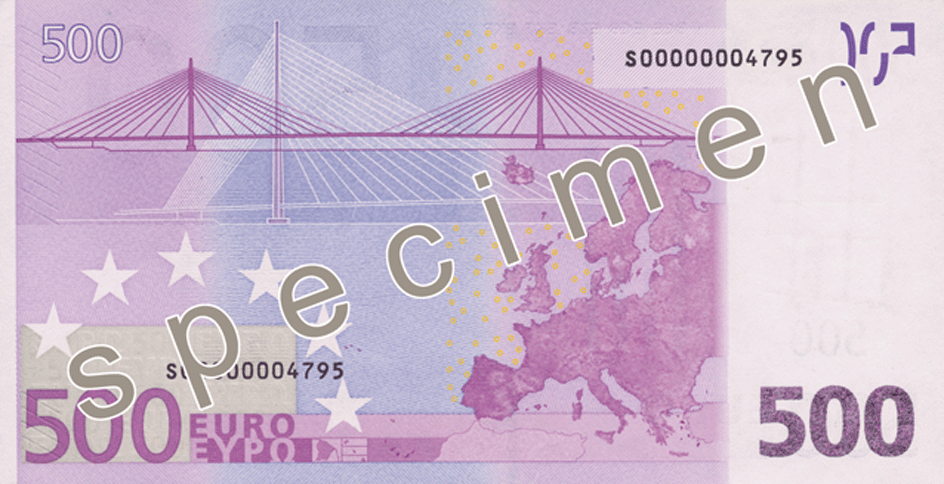
The reverse image of 500 euro note, the modern architecture bridge inspired from the similar-types of Tengku Fisabilillah cable-stayed bridge
