= Rempang Island =

Island in Barelang of Riau Archipelago, Indonesia

Coordinates: 0°52′N 104°09′E

Rempang
- Interactive map of Rempang

Geography
- Location: Southeast Asia
- Archipelago: Riau
- Area: 165.83 km^{2} (64.03 sq mi)

Administration
- Indonesia
- Province: Riau Islands
- City: Batam
- District: Galang

Demographics
- Languages: Indonesian (official)
- Ethnic groups: Rempang Malays and Orang Darat (native); Malays, Javanese, Orang Laut, etc.

Rempang Island (Indonesian: pulau Rempang) is an Indonesian island, located 2.5 km southeast of the neighbouring Batam Island, with the total land mass size of 165.83 km^{2}. Rempang Island belongs to the three-interconnected islands group of Riau Archipelago known as Barelang (an abbreviation of Batam-Rempang-Galang), and administratively part of the Riau Islands Province. The nearest urban city to Rempang Island is the Tanjung Pinang City, located on neighbouring Bintan Island.

== History ==
Rempang Island was originally uninhabited, and remained so until the end of the 20th century. The Barelang Bridge was built by the Indonesian government from 1992 to 1998 in an effort to develop the economic and business sector on the island which was thought as the continuation of business line to connect Rempang to the neighbouring islands of Batam and Galang.

Although the island was initially uninhabited, there are claims made by the Malays (the ethnic group of neighbouring Sumatra Island) that Rempang was inhabited some times around the 15th century, which functioned in that era as one of the vassal military bases of the Sumatran monarch of Melayu. However, it is highly disputed by most scholars since there is no clear evidences to support the idea and claim. Another claim was circulated by the same protesters group that there had been pre-existing settlements of at least 16 villages on Rempang since 1834, but the authority failed to legally confirmed their claims since there were no actual proven documents of it.

=== 2001–present: Economic development plan and relocation issues ===
Around 2001 to 2002, the government of Indonesia designed a plan to develop the Rempang Island further by proposing to build the eco-based tourism site and several industrial firms, it was later officially legalized under the Batam Regional People's Representative Council decree dated 17 May 2004, the plan caught the attention of international investors and the agreement was set and approved but the progress of the development was slow. As the continuation of Memorandum of Understanding that was approved since 2004 under the Batam Regional People's Representative Council decree dated 17 May 2004, the XinYi Group based in China stated on 18 August 2023 that they intend to rebuild their 'delayed' business of glass production industrial site on the island. The industrial site is planned to be constructed in May 2024.

The development of the glass production industry and the tourist site requires the relocation of all the island's 7,500 inhabitants. The Indonesian government planned to reimburse the affected inhabitants by providing the relocated inhabitants with a new house located on a 500 sqm land. The house is promised to be ready in 6 to 7 months, and the affected inhabitants will receive IDR 1.2 million monthly as the new houses are being constructed.

On 21 August 2023, some locals began to blockade the Barelang Bridge connecting Rempang and Batam. A protest on 12 September 2023 involving 1,000 participants turned into a riot, as they refused to be relocated to another housing area that are being prepared for them, and claimed have lived on the island for years. President Joko Widodo stated that the conflict was triggered by a lack of communication, and directed Bahlil Lahadalia, the Indonesian Minister of Investment to have direct communications with affected residents on the compensation plan.

According to the Indonesian police, about 43 protesters were arrested for injuring police officers and causing damage, with 5 of them tested positive for consuming illegal drugs or narcotics. 22 police officers were injured during the riot. 20 of the locals are injured, and the National Commission on Human Rights claimed that the police have used excessive force. Indonesian human rights activists also claimed that the police targeted used tear gas haphazardly.

Tensions have been attributed to a generally unfavorable attitude toward Chinese investments in Indonesia, and more locally, the continued police effort seeking those involved in the disturbance.

On 20 September 2023, Bahlil claimed that the locals have consented to the relocation as long as they are not relocated outside the island. On the next day, some of the locals rejected the statement of Bahlil as many of them still haven't consented to their relocation.

On 21 September 2023, certain island residents chose not to engage in fishing activities due to concerns that the government might attempt relocation while they were away at sea.

== Demographics ==
The Rempang Malays and the Orang Darat are the native inhabitants of Rempang Island have the same culture as the Malays in Riau and the Riau Islands in general as well as the Malays on the Malay Peninsula, more precisely Johor. In 2023, Rempang Malays population will number around 5,000 which consists of 3 sub-groups, namely Galang Malays (Malay descendants from Galang Island), Orang Darat (native inhabitants of Rempang Island who live nomadic lives in the forest), and Orang Laut (nomadic fishermen or some who live permanently; inhabit the coast). All of them adhere to Sunni Islam which has its roots since the era of Riau-Lingga Sultanate.
