= Galang Island =

Island in Indonesia containing a former refugee area

Coordinates: 0°45′N 104°14′E

Galang
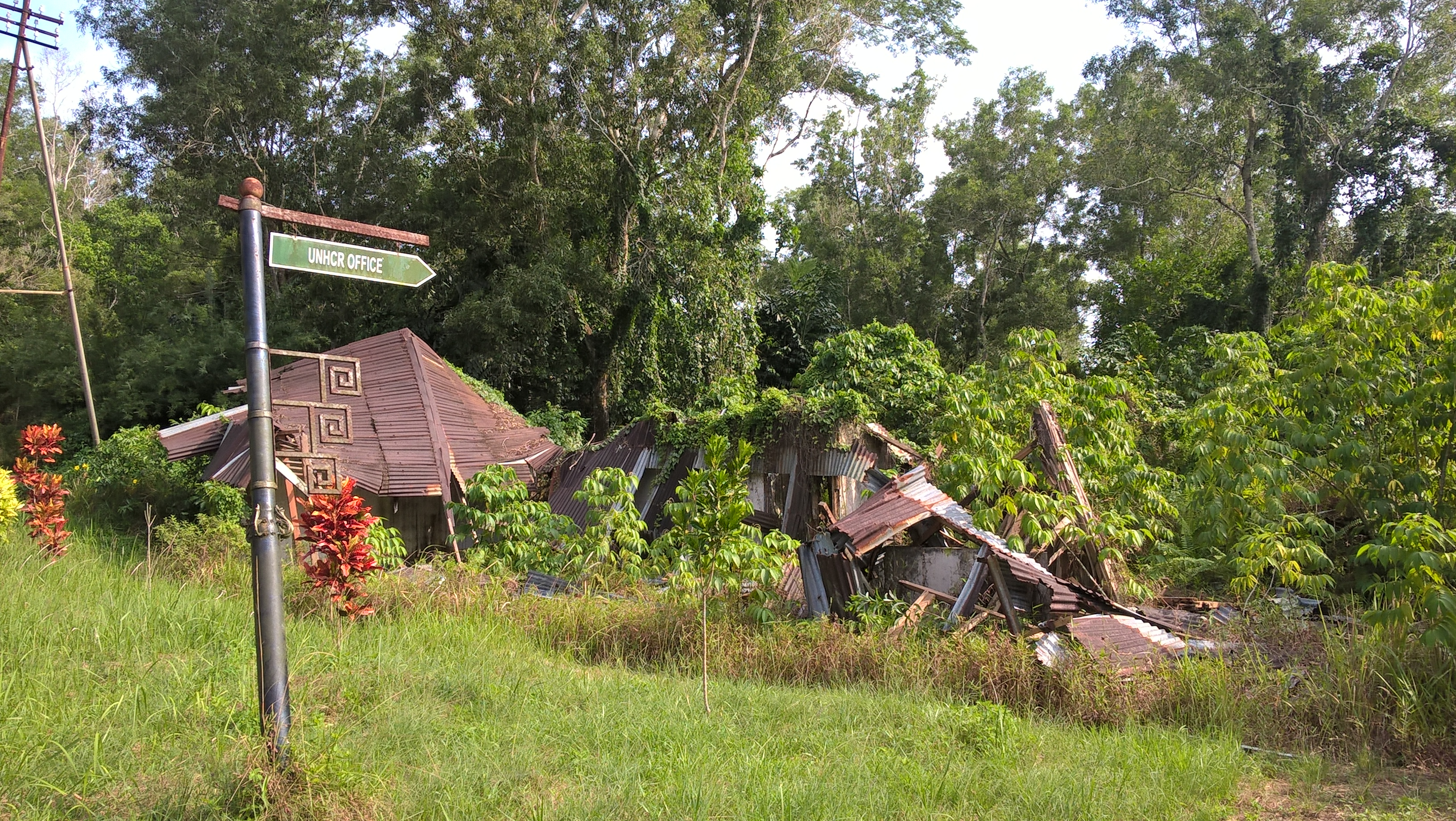
- Galang Refugee Camp - Site Area
- Interactive map of Galang

Geography
- Location: Southeast Asia

Administration
- Indonesia
- Province: Riau Islands
- City: Batam
- District (Kecamatan): Galang

Galang (Indonesian: Pulau Galang) is an island of 80 km^{2} located 25 mi (40 km) southeast of Batam, belonging to a group of three islands called Barelang (an abbreviation of Batam-Rempang-Galang). Part of the Riau Archipelago, Indonesia, Galang is located just south of Batam and Rempang which themselves are just south of Singapore and Johor. Administratively, all three islands form part of the city of Batam; the nearest other city to Galang is Tanjungpinang on Bintan island, about a 30-minute boat ride away. The island is connected by the Barelang Bridge to Rempang and Batam.

There was a UNHCR administration office established in Galang to run the Galang Refugee Camp during the 1979-1996 period. Many Vietnamese boat people and asylum seekers were temporarily accommodated in the Galang camp during the determination of their refugee status and their subsequent resettlement in the United States, Australia, and some European countries. Many Vietnamese from their new resettled countries have come back to visit Galang.

Today, Galang Island (and the former refugee area known as Sinam Camp) is managed by Batam Industrial Development Authority (BIDA). In 1992 according to Indonesian Presidential Decree No. 28/1992, the expanded BIDA Working Area includes Rempang Island, Galang Island and several small nearby islands. BIDA built 6 bridges which were inaugurated on 25 January 1998. They provide a land connection between Batam Island - Tonton Island - Nipah Island - Setoko Island - Rempang Island - Galang Island - Galang Baru (New Galang) Island in order to develop all these islands.

In August 2025, Indonesia announced that they will convert the island into a medical facility to treat about 2,000 Palestinians who were injured during the Gaza war.

== See also ==
- Bidong Island
- UNHCR
- Comprehensive Plan of Action
- Galang Refugee Camp
