= Galang (surname) =

Galang is a Filipino surname meaning "respect" in Tagalog. Notable people with the surname include:

- Rey Galang, Filipino martial arts teacher and author
- Zoilito Galang (1895–1959), Filipino author
