= Bulan Island =

Island in Indonesia

Coordinates: 0°58′24″N 103°53′53″E

Bulan Island or Pulau Bulang is an island located 2.5 km south-west of Batam Island, with a land area of 100 km^{2}. It is located in the Sijori Growth Triangle, Riau Islands Province, Indonesia. It is the largest island adjacent to Batam on its western side and is administratively part of Batam city. The strait between them is shallow and land reclamation and island amalgamation is feasible.

The entire island is operated by PT Indo Tirta Suaka, a subsidiary of the Salim Group. The company operates a pig farm, and associated crocodile and orchid farms.
