= Riau Archipelago =

Indonesian archipelago

Coordinates: 0.900°N 104.450°E

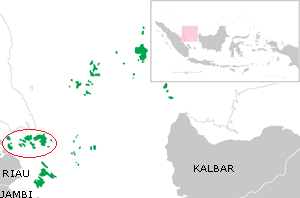
Red circle around the Riau archipelago, within Riau Islands Province (green)

The Riau Archipelago is a geographic term (as opposed to administrative region) for the core group of islands within the Riau Islands Province in Indonesia, and located south of Singapore and east of Riau on Sumatra. Before the province of Riau Islands was formed, there was no ambiguity in term; however, in Indonesian language, both the archipelago and administrative province are referred to simply as "Kepulauan Riau". The province may have the word "Provinsi" preceding it for clarity. Additionally, the term BBK for Batam Bintan Karimun may refer to the archipelago.

== History ==
The name of this archipelago predates the creation of the Indonesian province, and historically did not include the Lingga Islands or Natuna Islands, which now belong to that province. On the other hand, Singapore was considered a part of the islands, at least in the Islamic eras.

=== Srivijaya and Jambi ===
From 650 CE–1377 CE are accepted dates for the Srivijaya empire, when the area seemed to be well within the bounds of their control. The Jambi Kingdom sacked the Srivijaya capital in 1088, allowing that empire to grow and spread Malay as a lingua franca, ostensibly as a successor or part of the Srivijaya empire itself. The Pamalayu expedition force of the Singhasari empire in 1275 sacked the Jambi/Srivijaya forces. Bintan was a staging ground in the Malay Annals for the foundation of a state at Temasek (Singapore).

=== Singapura era ===
The Kingdom of Singapura dated from 1299 to 1398 but it is not known how much influence it wielded on the nearby Riau archipelago.

=== Islamic era ===
When exactly control passed to the Malacca Sultanate is unknown, but that sultanate dates from 1400 until 1511, when the Portuguese conquered and sacked Malacca (Melaka). Some time after, the Johor Sultanate, once itself part of the Malacca Sultanate, took control of the area until Sultan Mahmud III's death in 1811, and Singapore's purchase in 1819, the islands of the Riau Archipelago, along with Temasek (now Singapore). The islands then became part of the Riau-Lingga Sultanate, created after the succession dispute following the death of Mahmud III of Johor, when Abdul Rahman was crowned as the first Sultan of Riau-Lingga in 1812.

=== Colonial era ===
The Anglo-Dutch Treaty of 1824 established the border between Dutch and British interests and awarded the islands to the Dutch sector of influence. Henceforth, Singapore was no longer co-administered. The remaining archipelago became a part of the Residency of Riau and Dependencies (Residentie Riouw en Onderhoorigheden Riouw).

=== Modern ===
- In 1989, the Sijori Growth Triangle was formed to speed up development, especially in Batam.
- In 2002, Riau Islands Province was carved out of Riau Province.
- In 2009, the area was formally included in a free-trade zone, though it had already been operating as such.
- In 2026, a marine intelligence company noted in an interview with BBC News that the area was "an epicentre of maritime lawlessness", with tankers transferring oil ship-to-ship to evade sanctions on Iran or Russia

== Social change ==
A number of studies and books have detailed growing violence and concern about identity and social change in the archipelago. As the Malay, who were once the dominant ethnic group in the islands, have been reduced to about a third of the population, primarily as a result of immigration from elsewhere in Indonesia, they feel that their traditional rights are threatened. Similarly, the immigrants have felt politically and financially suppressed. Both of these causes have led to increased violence.

Piracy in the archipelago is also an issue.

== Islands ==
The main islands are Batam, Rempang, Galang, Bintan, Combol, Kundur, and Karimun.

Tanjung Pinang located in the south of Bintan Island is the provincial capital. Tanjung Balai Karimun is an international port along with Tanjung Pinang.

== Transport ==
High speed ferry services exist to the archipelago of the south, the Lingga Islands (Kepulauan Lingga).
