= Nagoya, Batam =

District in Batam City, Kepulauan Riau Province, Indonesia

Nagoya, officially Lubuk Baja, is a district (kecamatan) in Batam, Indonesia, covering 11.426 square kilometers. The population was 80,780 in the 2010 Census, while the official estimate of population was 86,277 in mid 2022. However, like other fastest growing cities, Batam Island is becoming a continuous urban sprawl, making its districts denser.

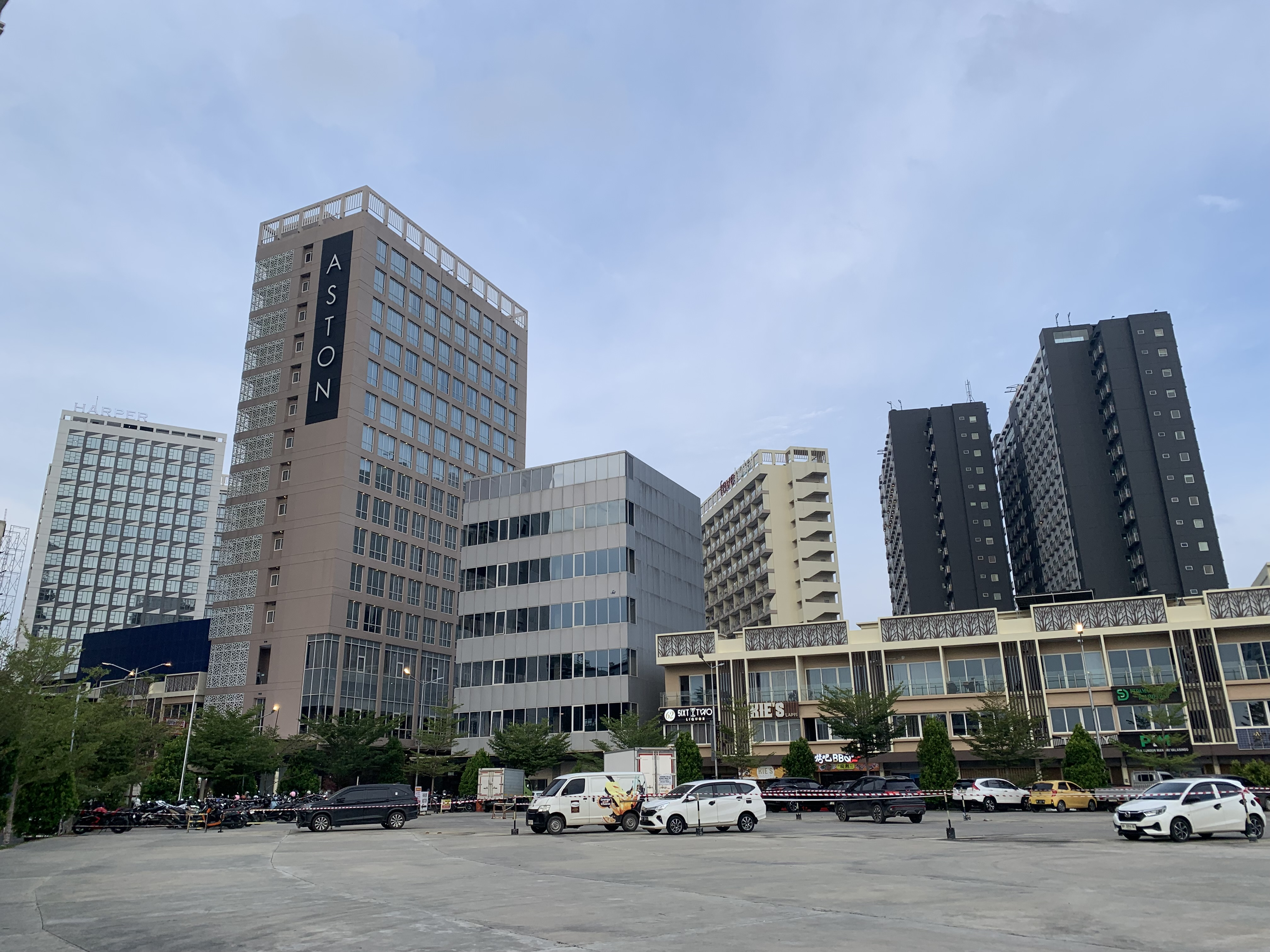
Downtown of Nagoya Batam

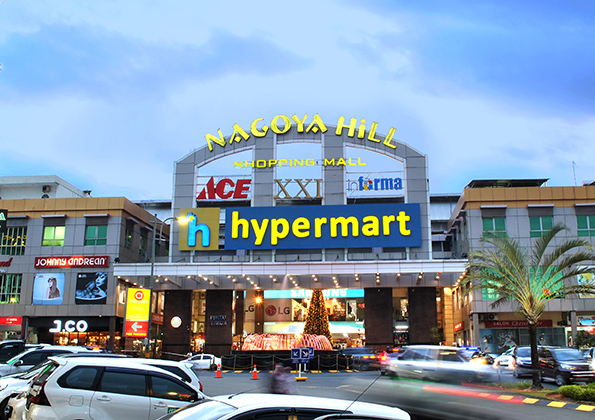
Nagoya Hill Superblock

== History ==
The town was dubbed "Nagoya" after the Japanese city by Japanese engineers from the Taisei Corporation, who came to Batam in the 1970s to work on infrastructure projects.

== Governance ==
The district (kecamatan) of Lubuk Baja, Batam, is divided into five villages (desa or kelurahan). These are:

- Kelurahan Baloi Indah
- Kelurahan Batu Selicin
- Kelurahan Lubuk Baja Kota
- Kelurahan Kampung Pelita
- Kelurahan Tanjung Uma

== Uniqueness of The Area ==
Nagoya is the main commercial and entertainment hub of Batam, featuring major shopping mall such as Nagoya Hill Mall, Grand Batam Mall, and Batam City Square (BCS) Mall, along with popular culinary hubs including A2 Foodcourt and Nagoya Foodcourt. The area also offers numerous hotels, spas, and wellness centers, making it a popular destination for both leisure and shopping tourism. Within the Nagoya district, the Penuin area is home to Penuin Market, one of the most established traditional markets in Batam and a popular destination for local souvernirs, particularly kue lapis. In recent years, the surrounding area has developed into a vibrant café and dining destination, creating a unique blend of modern lifestyle and traditional commerce that attracts both local residents and international visitors.

== Economy ==
Most of the district's income comes from its business, entertainment, and tourism sector. The best known building is Nagoya Hill Mall, the biggest shopping mall in the district. As a shopping area, it attracts many tourists and locals across the city every week.

The other main sector is the food business. Nagoya is known for its food quality and diversity, ranging from local cuisine to popular fast food restaurants, mostly in the mall.

Nagoya is also home to many shopping stores and retails. Home appliance stores, fashion boutiques, and electronic stores are common in the area, mostly concentrated in the mall and its surroundings.

Most of its tourism comes from hotels. There are numerous hotels in this district, ranging from 2 to 4-star.

The Nagoya Entertainment District (NED) consists of bars, massage parlors, clubs, hotels, and brothels.
