= Batam =

Largest city in Riau Islands, Indonesia

- City
- City of Batam; Kota Batam

Regional transcription(s)
  - Jawi: باتم
  - Chinese: 巴淡; Bā dàn (Pinyin)
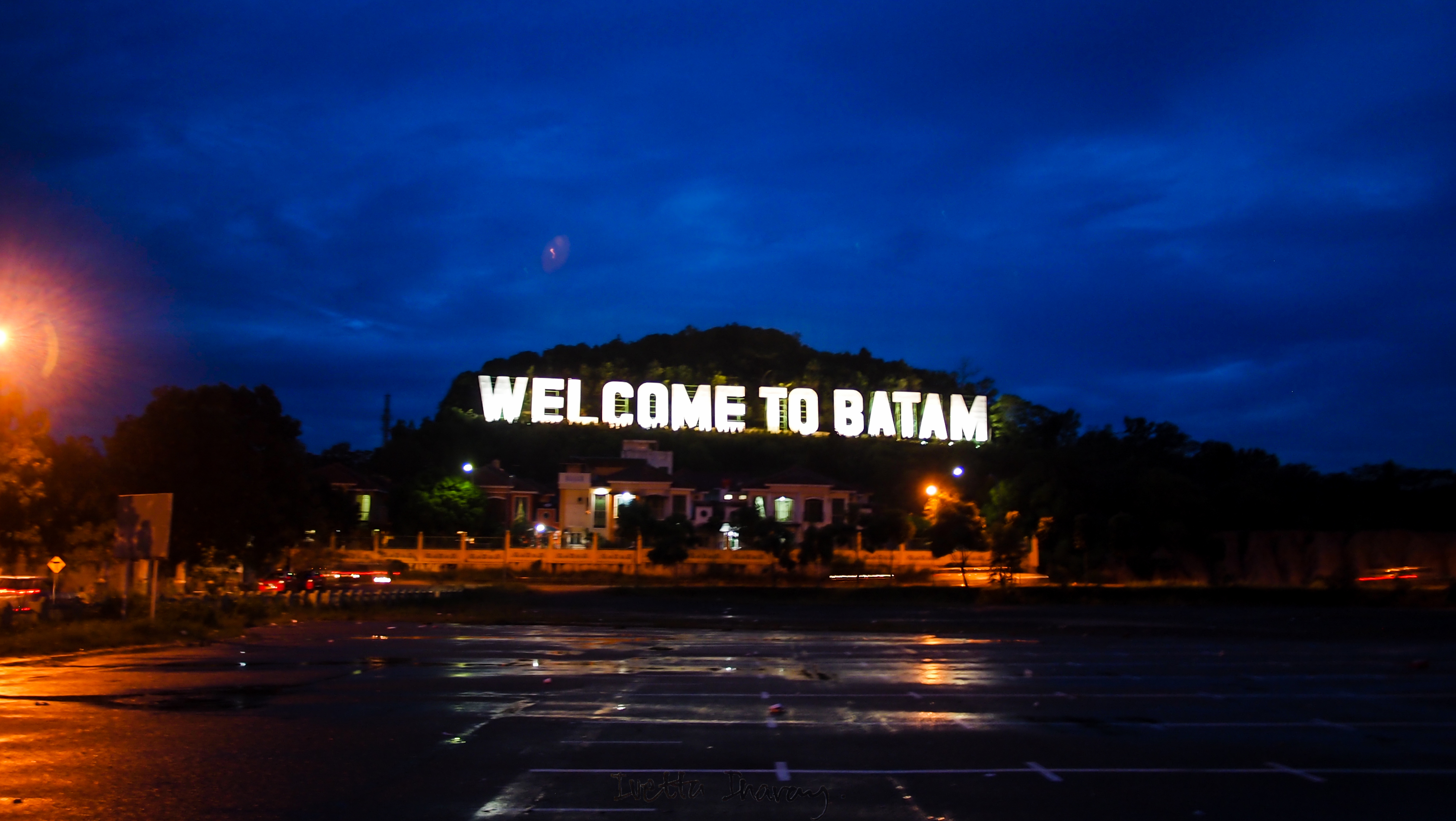
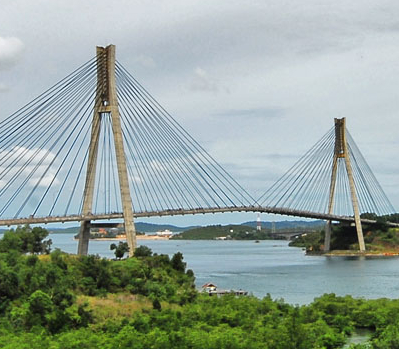
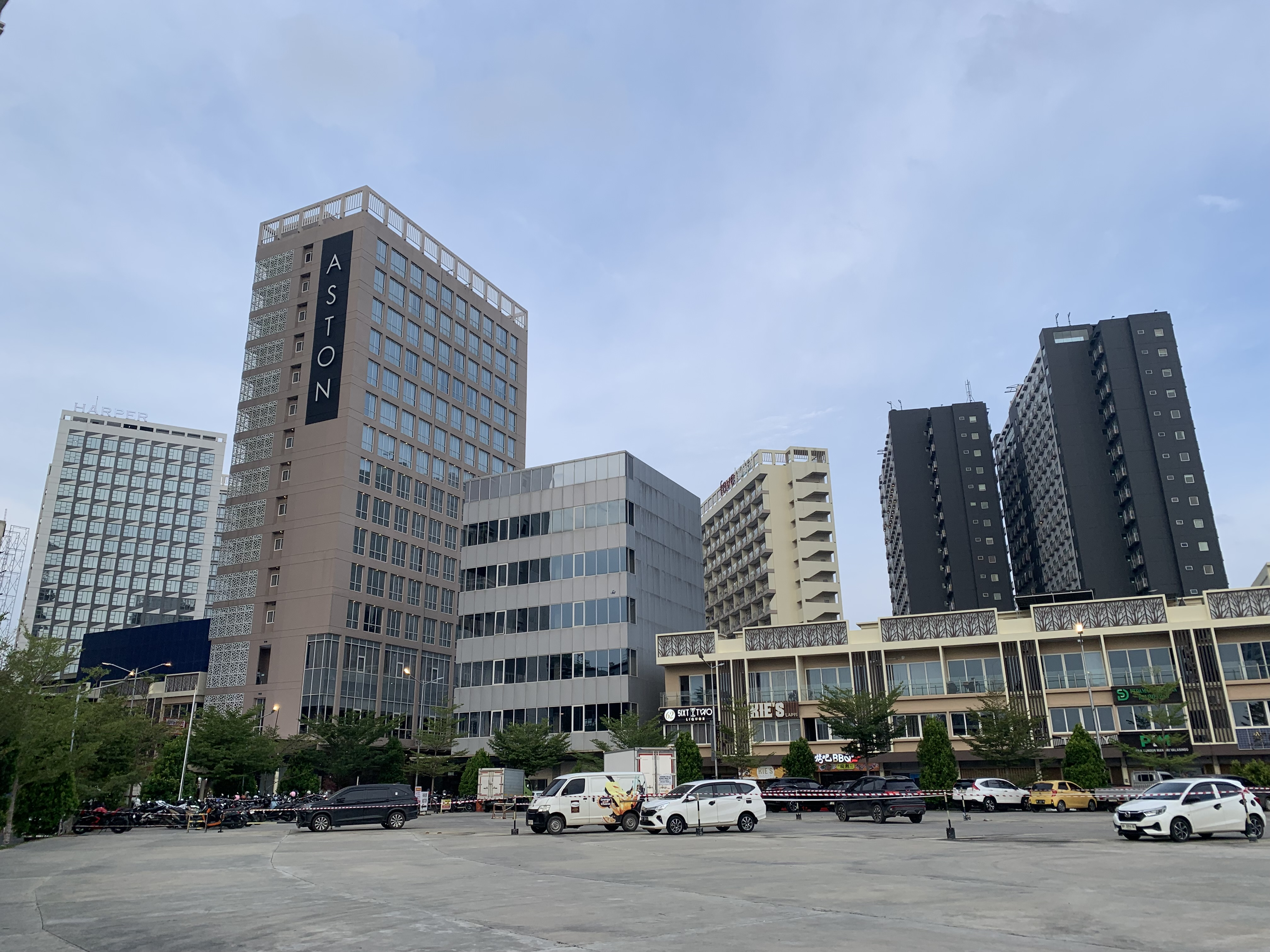
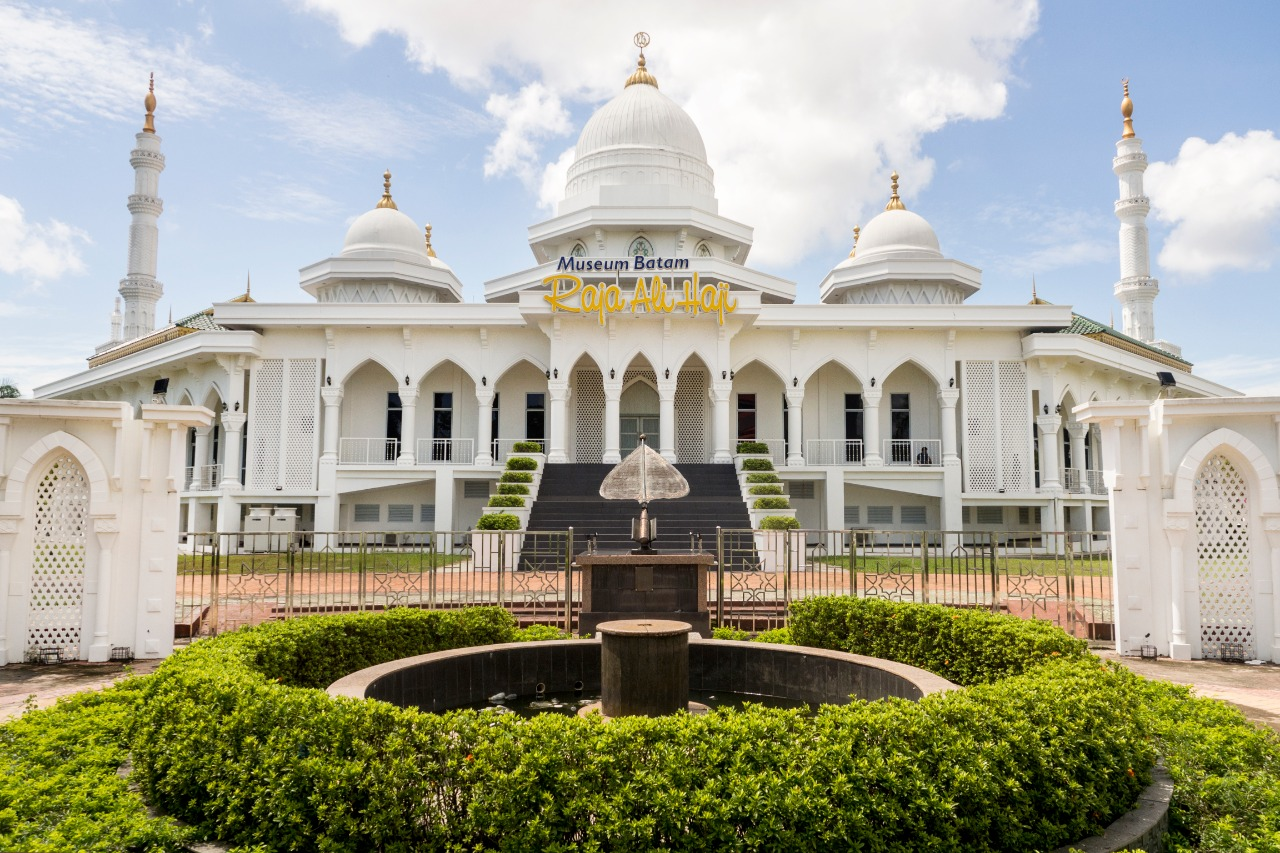
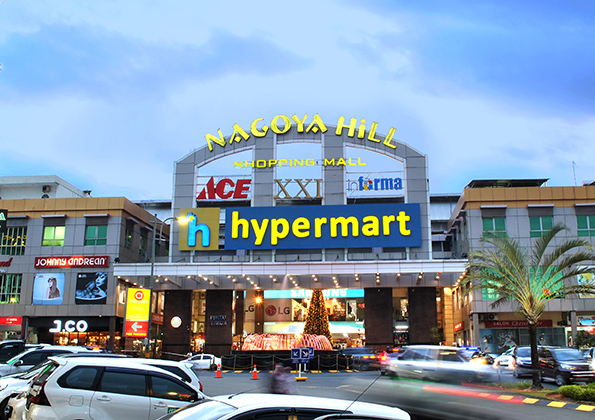
- Welcome sign to the city Barelang Bridge Downtown of Nagoya Batam Raja Ali Haji Museum Nagoya Hill shopping mall

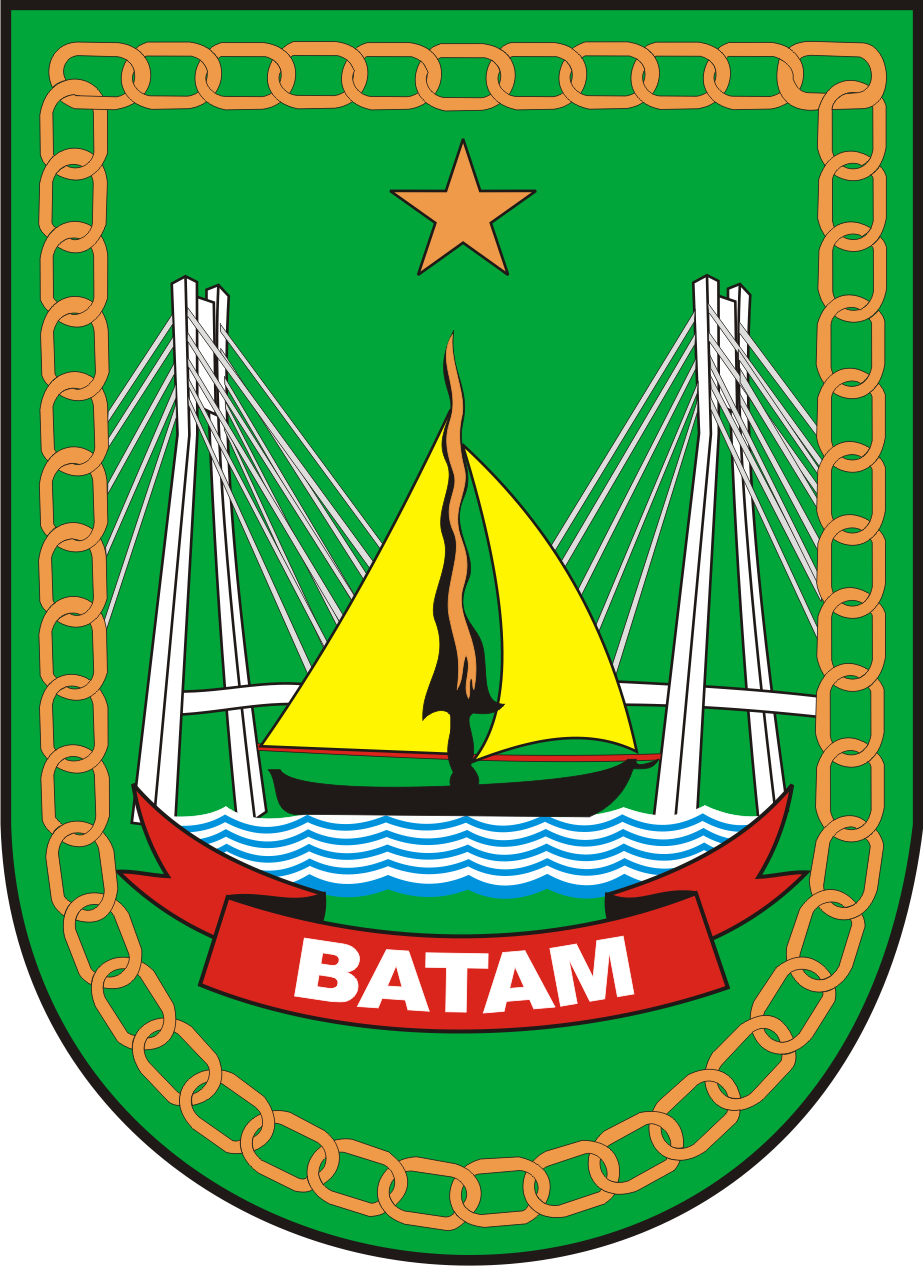
- Coat of arms
- Nickname: Kota Industri ("The Industrial City")
- Motto: Bandar Dunia Madani
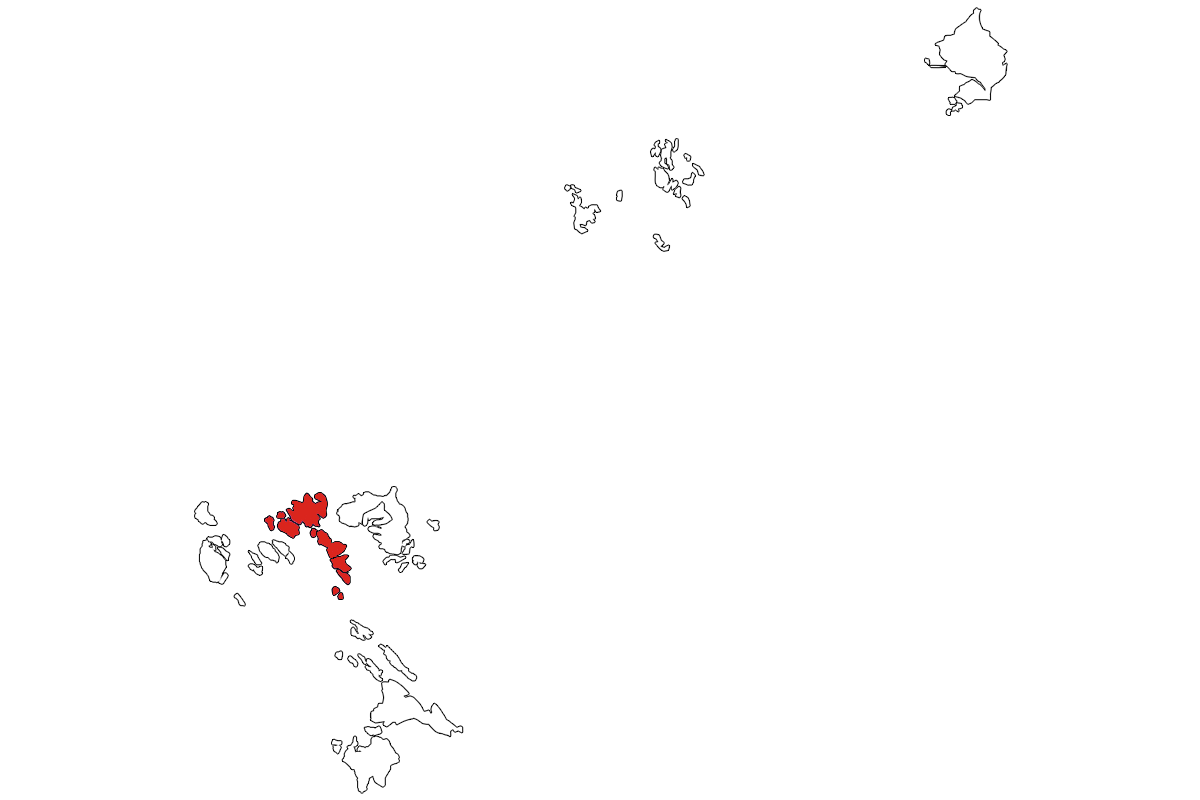
- Location within Riau Islands

- Location within Sumatra Location within Indonesia
- Coordinates: 01°07′48″N 104°03′11″E
- Country: Indonesia
- Province: Riau Islands

Government
  - Mayor: Amsakar Achmad
  - Vice mayor: Li Claudia Chandra
  - Legislature: Batam City Regional House of Representatives (DPRD)

Area
  - City: 1,915 km^{2} (739 sq mi)
  - Land: 1,020.28 km^{2} (393.93 sq mi)
  - Water: 880 km^{2} (340 sq mi)

Population (mid 2025 estimate)
  - City: 1,296,960
  - Density: 1,271.18/km^{2} (3,292.34/sq mi)
  - Urban: 1,256,610
- Time zone: UTC+7 (Indonesia Western Time)
- Postal code: 29453
- Area code: (+62) 778
- Vehicle registration: BP
- HDI (2023): ▲0.826 (25th) – very high
- Website: batam.go.id

Batam, officially the City of Batam or Batam City (Indonesian: Kota Batam, not to be confused with Batam Kota, a district within this city), is the largest city in the Indonesian province of the Riau Islands.

The city of Batam includes Batam Island at 410 square kilometres (160 mi^{2}), as well as other major islands such as Rempang at 165 square kilometres (64 mi^{2}) and Galang at 80 square kilometres (31 mi^{2}). Together, the three-interconnected islands of the Riau Archipelago are known as Barelang (an abbreviation of Batam–Rempang–Galang). The remaining hundreds of tiny islands are largely conservation areas, small fishing outposts, or uninhabited mangroves. Collectively, the land area of all these islands make up around 1,020.28 square kilometres (393.93 mi^{2}). Batam Island is the core urban and industrial zone, while both Rempang Island and Galang Island maintain their rural character and low-density population; they are connected to Batam Island by short bridges. Bulang Island and the islands to its north lie to the west of Batam Island; while they are part of the Belakang Padang District, they are also administratively within the city.

Batam City is an industrial boomtown, an emerging transport hub and part of a free trade zone in the Indonesia–Malaysia–Singapore Growth Triangle, located 20 km (12 mi) off Singapore's south coast. According to Statistics Indonesia's 2020 census, Batam had a municipal population of 1,196,396, making it the third largest city in the region of Sumatra, after Medan and Palembang. Islands that form part of Batam are also the closest parts of Indonesia to Singapore, at a minimum distance of 6 km (3.7 miles) across the Singapore Strait. In clear weather and good visibility, both Batam and Singapore are visible from each other with the naked eye. Batam was the fastest-growing municipality in Indonesia during the decade prior to 2010, with a population growth rate of 11% per year; however, there were setbacks during the subsequent decade. In 2017, the island suffered severe job losses; some 300,000 workers were laid off. The official estimated population as of mid 2025 was 1,296,960.

== History ==
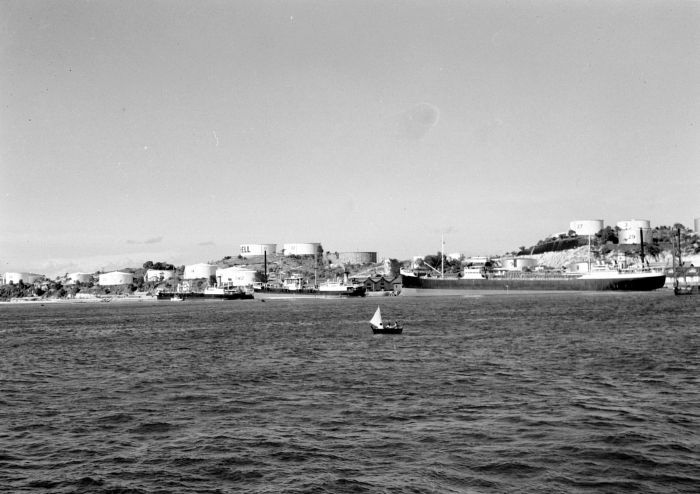
Harbor view with oil tanks from Shell at Sambu Island, 1936

The first recorded inhabitants at Batam Island are the Malays known as the Orang Laut, from the year 231 CE. Then the Orang Darat who are the remnants of the pre-Malay population on the island of Batam and Rempang. The island group once served as the field of struggle of Admiral Hang Nadim, against Portuguese invaders in the 16th century, and was utilised by the Indonesian government in the 1960s, who maintained a petroleum logistics base on Sambu Island, one of the minor islands in the Batam group of islands.

In the 1970s, according to Presidential Decree No. 41/1973, Batam Island was designated as a working environment of an industrial area supported by Batam Island Industrial Development Authority or better known as Batam Authority Board (BOB, now Batam Development Board (Indonesian: Badan Pengusahan Batam or BP Batam) as the driving force for the development of Batam, with the initial aim of making Batam the "Indonesian version of Singapore". With the rapid development of the island, based on Government Regulation No. 34/1983, the Batam District (which is part of Riau Islands Regency) was upgraded to municipality status which has the duties to run government administration and society and support the development of BP Batam.

In the Indonesian Reformation era in the late 1990s, with Act No. 53/1999, the Batam administrative municipality changed its status to an autonomous region, namely Batam City Government to carry out governmental and developmental functions by involving BP Batam.

== Geography ==
Batam is a roughly oval island with many bays, islets, and peninsulas, located west of Bintan Island, south of Singapore, north of Rempang Island and Galang Island, and east of Bulang Island. The Singapore Strait separates Singapore and Batam, while the Riau Strait separates Batam and Bintan island. Batam Municipality covers 3,869 km^{2}, of which 1,020.28 km^{2} is land, a figure which includes some land reclamation. However, Barelang Island (not actually one but three, see above) covers roughly 715 km^{2} of that 1,020.28 km^{2}, and Batam island itself covers only about 410 km^{2} out of the total. The bulk of the municipal population resides on Batam Island.

=== Climate ===
Batam has a tropical rainforest climate (Af) with heavy rainfall year-round.

Climate data for Batam (Hang Nadim International Airport) (1991–2020 normals)
Month	Jan	Feb	Mar	Apr	May	Jun	Jul	Aug	Sep	Oct	Nov	Dec	Year
Mean daily maximum °C (°F)	30.4 (86.7)	30.7 (87.3)	31.5 (88.7)	32.1 (89.8)	32.0 (89.6)	31.6 (88.9)	31.3 (88.3)	31.3 (88.3)	31.4 (88.5)	31.6 (88.9)	30.9 (87.6)	30.4 (86.7)	31.3 (88.3)
Daily mean °C (°F)	27.0 (80.6)	27.4 (81.3)	27.9 (82.2)	28.1 (82.6)	28.0 (82.4)	27.8 (82.0)	27.6 (81.7)	27.5 (81.5)	27.4 (81.3)	27.5 (81.5)	27.1 (80.8)	27.0 (80.6)	27.5 (81.5)
Mean daily minimum °C (°F)	24.5 (76.1)	24.7 (76.5)	24.9 (76.8)	24.9 (76.8)	25.0 (77.0)	24.8 (76.6)	24.6 (76.3)	24.6 (76.3)	24.4 (75.9)	24.3 (75.7)	24.2 (75.6)	24.4 (75.9)	24.6 (76.3)
Average precipitation mm (inches)	201.5 (7.93)	83.2 (3.28)	143.9 (5.67)	150.0 (5.91)	197.6 (7.78)	173.2 (6.82)	168.6 (6.64)	174.1 (6.85)	167.5 (6.59)	202.8 (7.98)	266.1 (10.48)	286.2 (11.27)	2,214.7 (87.2)
Average precipitation days (≥ 1.0 mm)	9.2	5.6	8.1	11.4	14.1	12.7	12.5	11.9	12.3	12.4	15.8	14.3	140.3
Source: Starlings Roost Weather

== Governance ==
=== Mayor ===
The Batam city government takes care of all population administration and civil registration as well as human resources. The current mayor is Amsakar Achmad who has served since 2025, accompanied by Li Claudia Chandra as deputy mayor.

=== Batam Development Board (BP) ===
The Agency for Free Trade Zone and Free Port of Batam, often abbreviated as BP Batam, is a government nonstructural body under the Chairmanship of the Board of Regions (DK) Batam Central Government, which is chaired by a Coordinating Minister for Economic Affairs. BP Batam plays a role in land governance and investment in the Special Economic Zone (SEZ) of Batam.

=== Administrative divisions ===
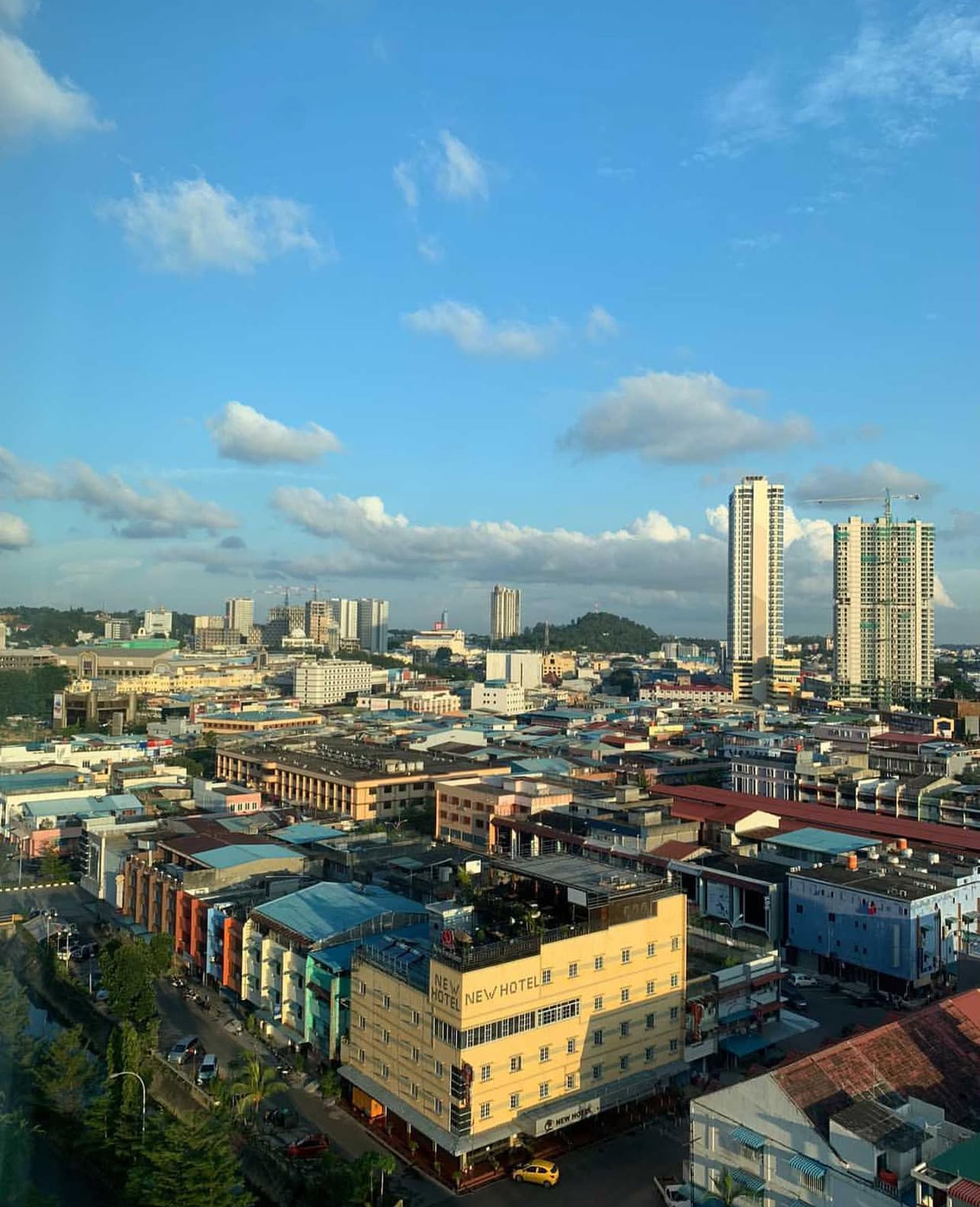
View of Batam downtown

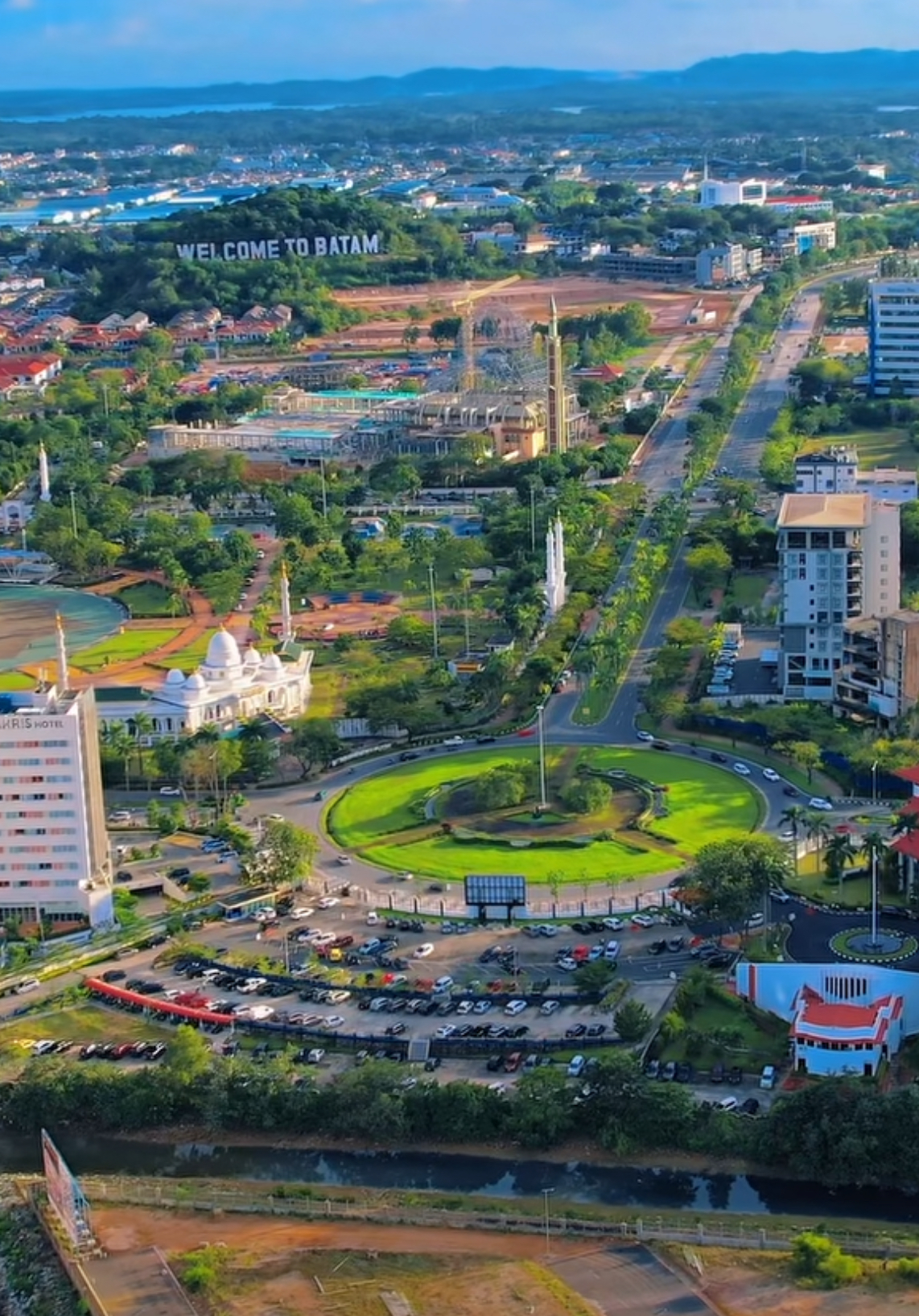
Panoramic view of Batam Centre

Batam city is divided into twelve districts (kecamatan) – which include several adjacent islands such as Bulang to the west, and Rempang and Galang to the south, as well as Batam Island itself. Batam Island is connected by bridges to Rempang and Galang, and this group is thus often known by the abbreviation of Barelang. The districts are tabulated below with their areas, 2010 census populations and 2020 census populations, together with the official estimates as at mid 2025. The table also includes the number of administrative villages within each district, all classed as urban kelurahan, and its postal codes.

Name of District (kecamatan)	Land Area in km^{2}	Pop'n Census 2010	Pop'n Census 2020	Pop'n estimate mid 2025	No. of villages	Postal codes
Belakang Padang ^{(a)}	66.32	18,508	22,439	23,640	6	29412, 29413; 29414, 29416
Bulang ^{(b)}	156.91	9,531	10,707	10,870	6	29471 - 29476
Galang ^{(c)}	344.81	14,983	16,989	17,330	8	29481 - 29487
Sungai Beduk (Sungai Beduk)	107.03	80,349	96,193	100,740	4	29433 & 29437
Sagulung	54.25	149,727	209,306	236,410	6	29439
Nongsa ^{(d)}	107.12	49,828	81,451	99,180	4	29465 - 29468
Batam Kota (Central City)	37.75	162,238	198,617	210,270	6	29431 - 29433, 29461, 29464
Sekupang ^{(e)}	71.76	100,108	156,283	186,110	7	29425 - 29428
Batu Aji	38.02	127,455	139,512	139,910	4	29422, 29424 & 29438
Lubuk Baja	10.91	80,780	84,533	82,950	5	29432, 29441, 29443 - 29445
Batu Ampar	11.71	58,745	60,450	58,840	4	29452 - 29454
Bengkong	13.69	92,033	119,836	130,710	4	29432 & 29458

Notes:

- (a) comprises 116 islands to the west of Batam Island, including Kepala Jeri Island, Lumba Island, Pemping Island and Belakang Padang.
- (b) comprises 70 islands to the southwest of Batam Island, including Bulang Island.
- (c) comprises 82 islands to the south of Batam Island, including Galang Island and Rempang Island.
- (d) comprises the east part of Batam Island, but also includes 23 islands off the north-eastern shore.
- (e) includes 14 islands off the north coast of Batam Island.

== Demographics ==
At the 2020 census, Batam had a population of 1,196,396 inhabitants. The population was increasing rapidly, with a population growth rate of more than 8% per year between 2001 and 2012, but the increase has subsequently slowed. It is now growing by about 20,000 persons per year

Historical population
Year	Pop.	±%
1971	6,000	—
1978	34,000	+466.7%
1988	88,000	+158.8%
1992	123,000	+39.8%
1998	294,000	+139.0%
2005	616,088	+109.6%
2010	944,285	+53.3%
2020	1,196,396	+26.7%
2025	1,296,960	+8.4%

=== Ethnicity ===
Ethnic groups in Batam, 2000
Ethnicity	Percentage
Malay	26.78%
Javanese	17.61%
Batak	14.97%
Minangkabau	14.93%
Chinese	6.28%
Buginese	2.29%
Banjarese	0.67%
Others	16.47%

Today, Batam is inhabited by a heterogeneous mixture of people due to labor migration and desire to be close to Singapore; it is very diverse, two-thirds of the population are migrants. The predominant ethnicities are Malays, Javanese, Batak, Minangkabau, and Chinese. The indigenous people of Batam who are related to the Malays are the Orang Laut who are nomads who depend on the sea for their livelihood and the Orang Darat who live nomadically in the interior forests of Rempang whose population is threatened with extinction. As a municipality it exemplifies the national motto of "Bhinneka Tunggal Ika" (Unity in Diversity). The location of Batam, which is close to Singapore, is conducive to the development of economic, sociopolitical, and cultural aspects of the local community.

=== Religion ===
Grand Mosque of Batam

Hock An Kiong Temple

Islam is the majority religion in Batam, followed by Christianity, Buddhism and Hinduism. Most of those who follow Islam are Javanese, Malays and Minangkabau. The Great Mosque of Batam, located in the city center adjacent to the main square, the mayor's office and the provincial Parliament, is an important symbol of Islamic religious life in Batam. Christianity is also widely embraced by the people of Batam, especially those from the Batak and Nias people of North Sumatra (Protestantism) and migrants from Flores island in Nusa Tenggara Timur province, East Indonesia (Roman Catholicism) as well as Javanese Catholics from Yogyakarta and Central Java who emigrated to this province along with a minority of Chinese Indonesians and internal migrant Indian Indonesians from Medan, North Sumatra. The majority of the Chinese population practises Buddhism. A number of Viharas are located in Batam, of which Vihara Duta Maitreya is one of the most frequented, and is the largest Vihara in Southeast Asia with an area of 4.5 hectares. In addition, Hinduism in practiced by a quarter of its small ethnic Indian Indonesian minority as well as by its Balinese emigrant minority ethnic populace who migrated from the tourist island of Bali and are resident for business purposes in this city.

=== Language ===
Indonesian is the common lingua franca of Batam in daily use. Other languages such as local Malay (similar to the Malaysian standard as spoken in neighbouring Malaysia and Singapore) since both varieties coexist with each other as the former is the official and national language widely spoken and used like in the rest of Indonesia whilst the latter is a trade language and widely spoken by Malaysian Malay expatriates from Johor, Malaysia as well as Malay Singaporeans from Singapore who reside for business purposes and also for historical purposes. Other ethnic minority languages such as Minangkabau, Batak, Javanese and Chinese ethnic dialects like Hokkien, Cantonese, Teochew and Hainanese are also widely used owing to the city's ethnolinguistic diversity in addition to the dominant ethnic Malay populace. The usage of Mandarin and English are trending due to Singaporean influence, especially by expatriates living in Batam.

== Economy ==
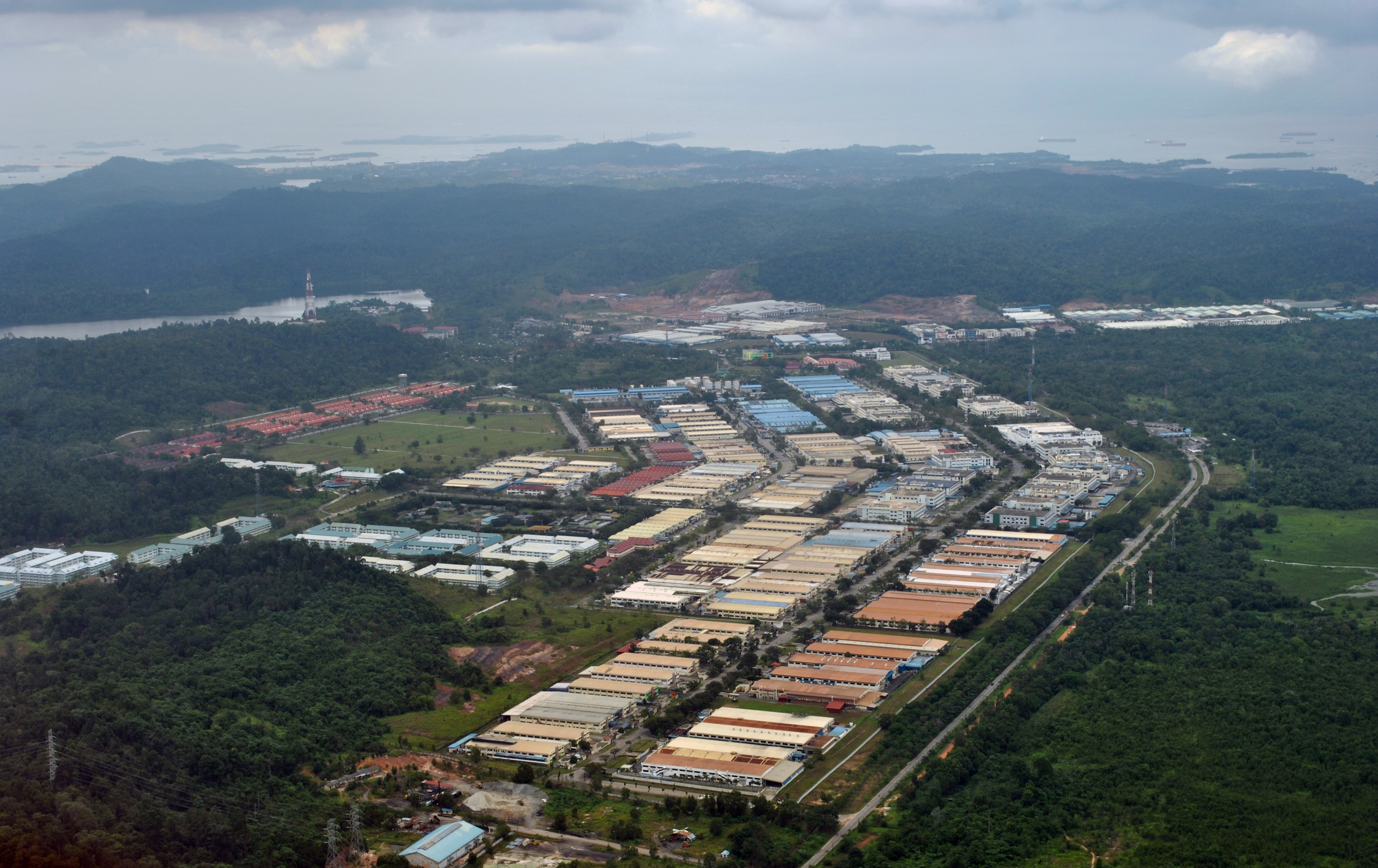
Industrial area in Batam

Based on Presidential Decree No. 41/1973, the Batam Industrial Development Authority (BP Batam) was established to manage 415 square kilometers of industrial complex in Batam City for heavy industry. Previously only Pertamina, the Indonesian state oil company, settled there with only 6,000 inhabitants. Shipbuilding and electronics manufacturing are important industries on the island. Being located close to the ports of Singapore, the speed of goods shipping and product distribution is increased, benefiting the island's economy. With lower labor costs and special government incentives, it is the site of many factories operated by foreign companies. For example, an Apple AirTag factory in Batam produces around 70 percent of AirTags globally, and employs around 2,000 workers.

Under a framework signed in June 2006, Batam, along with parts of neighbouring Bintan and Karimun, are a part of a Special Economic Zone with Singapore; this zone eliminates tariffs and value-added taxes for goods shipped between Batam and Singapore. In 2007, Law No. 44 was enacted to supplement Law No. 36/2000 in establishing Batam as a free trade zone for 70 years. BP Batam still manages the industrial complex. And in 2016, the responsibility of industrial complex changed from the governor of Riau Islands Province to the Office of the Coordinating Economic Minister as per Presidential Decree No. 8/2016.

=== Tourism ===
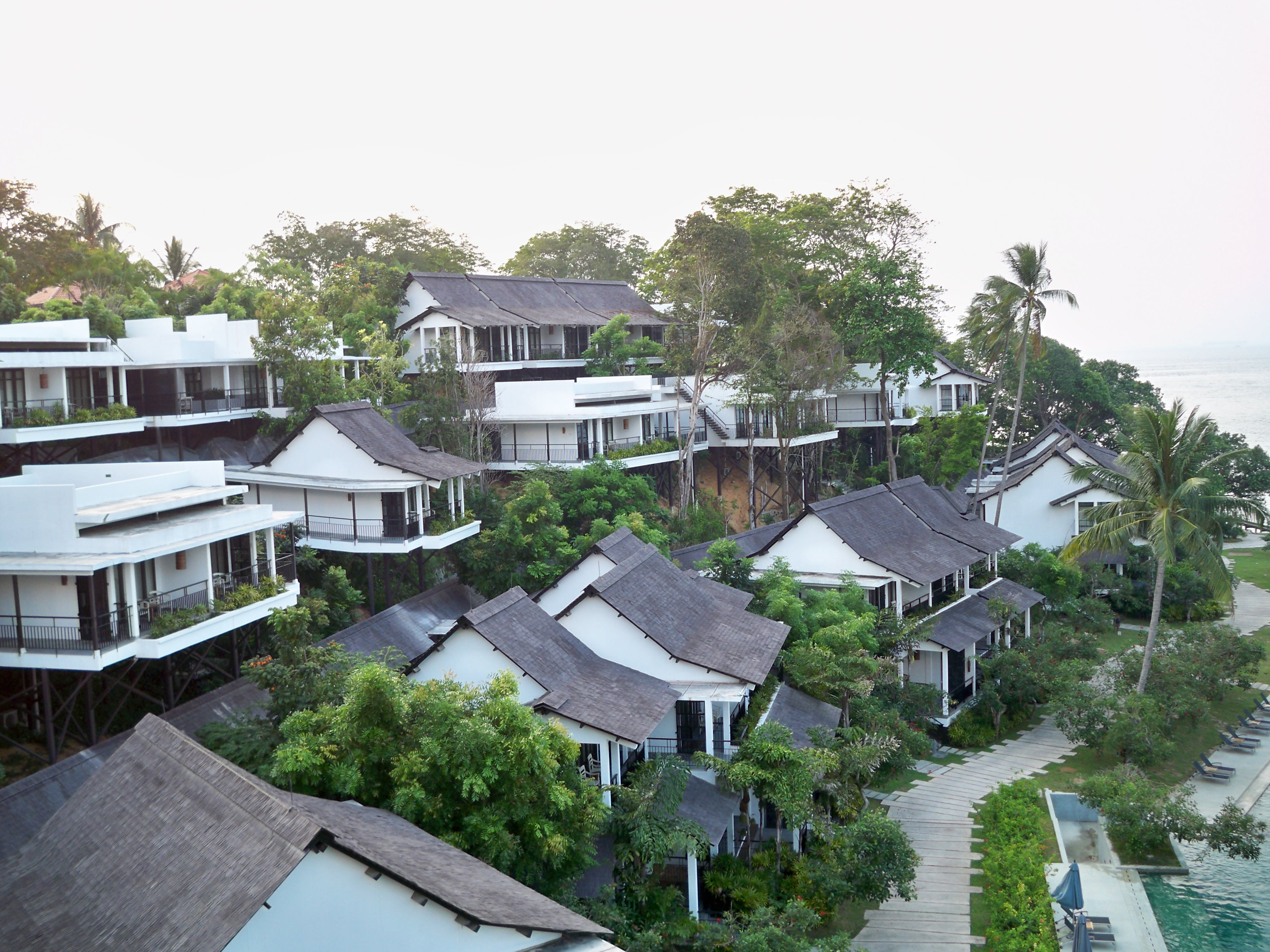
Turi Beach Resort at Nongsa, Batam

Over 1.5 million tourists visited the city in 2015. Batam is the third-busiest entry port to Indonesia next to Bali and Jakarta. In 2014, around 58.8% of foreign tourists came from Singapore, 12.8% from Malaysia and 4.2% from South Korea. Popular tourism spots in Batam include the Maha Vihara Duta Maitreya Temple, shopping malls (including Grand Batam Mall, Mega Mall Batam Centre, Nagoya Hill Shopping Centre, etc), Jabal Arafah Mosque and the Barelang Bridge. The former Harbour Bay Mall stopped operating in early March 2020.

=== Foreign investment ===
In the first semester of 2023, the value of foreign investment reached US$1.2 billion, while domestic investment was recorded at US$168 million. Most of the foreign investment came from Singapore. Foreigners are allowed to buy apartments with limited leases but not landed homes in Indonesia. In 2021, a group of Singaporeans were forcibly evicted after their 30-year property leases expired in Sekupang.

Batam has benefitted from the China–United States trade war, especially in the second presidency of Donald Trump with Chinese manufacturers relocating to Batam to avoid US tariffs. In June 2026, Australian artificial intelligence infrastructure company Firmus Technologies announced plans to develop a 360 MW Nvidia DSX AI Factory campus in Batam with Singapore-based DayOne. The data centre project, Firmus’s first in Indonesia, was reported to be under construction and scheduled to begin operations in the first quarter of 2027. In July 2026, the 50 km (31 mi) Nongsa–Changi Cable was completed between Nongsa Digital Park in Batam and Changi in Singapore. The 24-fibre-pair subsea cable, developed by BW Digital and Telekomunikasi Indonesia International, was scheduled to begin full operations in September 2026 and provide more than 1.6 petabits per second of capacity with latency below two milliseconds.

== Transport ==
=== Ferry ===
Sekupang International Ferry Terminal

Ferries connect Batam to Singapore, Bintan, and Johor Bahru (Malaysia). Five ferry terminals are on the island: Batam Harbour Bay Ferry Terminal, Nongsapura Ferry Terminal, Sekupang, Waterfront City and Batam Center Ferry Terminal. Connections to Singapore are by way of HarbourFront Centre and Tanah Merah Ferry Terminals run by Singapore Cruise Centre (SCC).

The most recent incident happened on 29 November 2015 when a ferry, 'Sea Prince', hit floating object(s) while en route to Singapore from Batam and began leaking. A total of 97 passengers were rescued on life rafts.

Signs showing a picture of a raised finger over a pair of lips have been placed in August 2014 at the Batam Centre International Ferry Terminal to request silence while queuing for immigration to hear names being called and clearly hear instructions given by the immigration officer. Some visitors have been sent back immediately on the first ferry available for flouting this rule. The signs are also applicable at other terminals, but are not strictly enforced.

=== Trans Batam ===
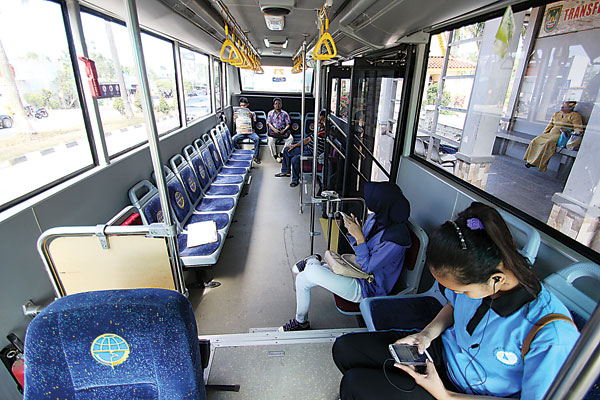
Trans Batam interior

Trans Batam is the most reliable and the cheapest public transportation in Batam. It began to operate in 2005. Trans Batam is the second BRT system in Indonesia, after Jakarta's TransJakarta. The price for one ride is Rp2,500 for students and Rp5,000 for the public. Trans Batam operates from 05:30 to 19:00.

Trans Batam serves nine corridors of route:

Corridor	Origin & destination
1	Sekupang–Batam Centre
2	Tanjung Uncang–Batam Centre
3	Sekupang–Jodoh
4	Sagulung–Sekupang
5	Jodoh–Batam Centre
6	Tanjung Piayu–Batam Centre
7	Nongsa–Batam Centre
8	Punggur–Jodoh
9	Nongsa-Jodoh
Source: Batam City Government Transportation Agency

=== Taxi ===
Taxis in Batam are available almost anywhere at ferry terminals, the airport, shopping malls, hotels, etc. More than 3000 taxis are in Batam.

=== Airport ===
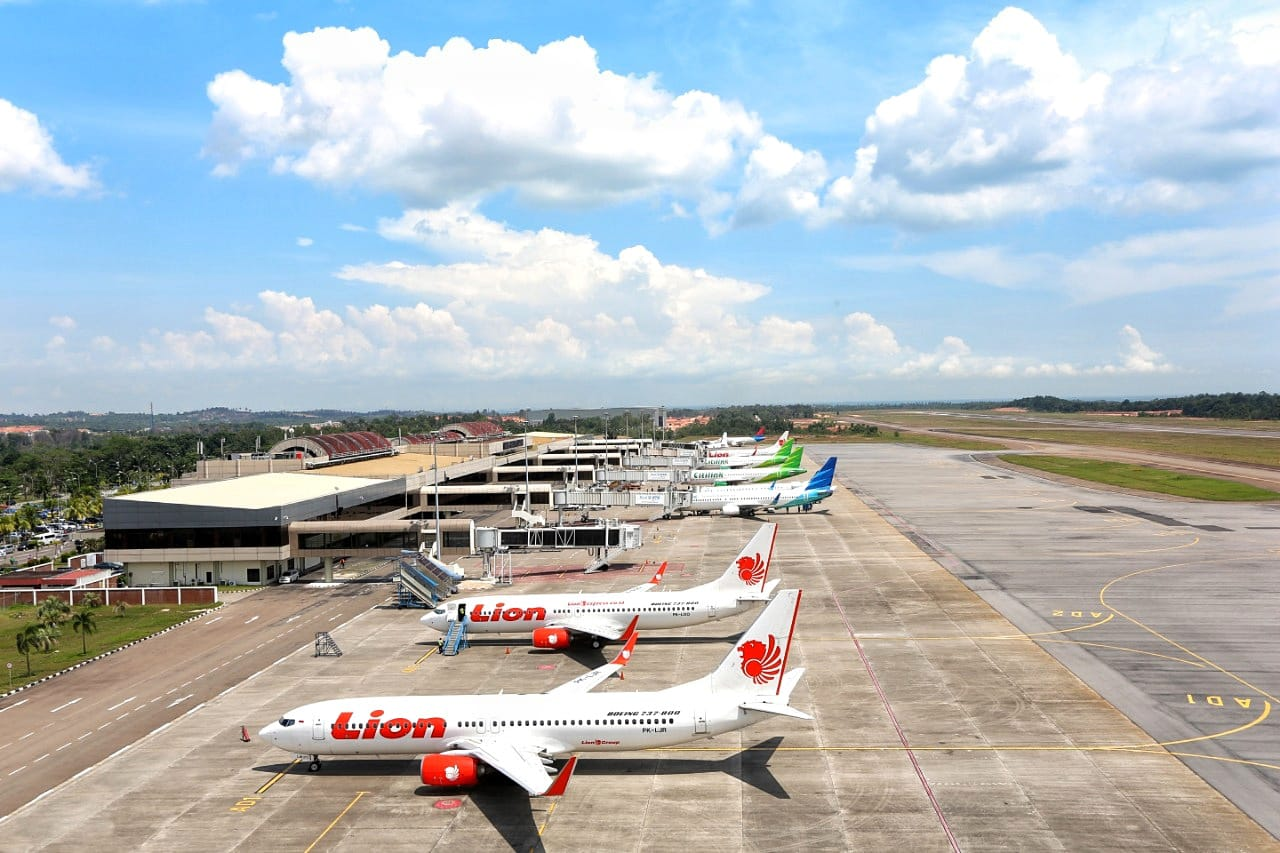
Hang Nadim International Airport

Hang Nadim International Airport is Batam island's main airport, and has the longest runway of all airports in Indonesia. The airport was the largest airport in the Sumatra region from 1995 to 2012 with a capacity of six million passengers annually, and is now the second-largest in the Sumatra region after Kuala Namu International Airport in Medan, which has a capacity of eight million passengers. The airport has 4 paired jetbridges and 2 single jetbridges. Hang Nadim International Airport is a hub for Lion Air, Batik Air and Citilink. BP Batam, which operates Hang Nadim International Airport, will build a new terminal with a capacity of eight million passengers per year for each terminal (16 million passengers per year in total for two terminals) in late 2016. BP Batam intends to build eight paired jetbridges in the new terminal. Domestic destinations include Pekanbaru, Palembang, Medan, Jakarta, Padang, Surabaya, Bandung, Bandar Lampung, Balikpapan, Yogyakarta, Makassar, and many more. International flights currently include Kuala Lumpur, Malaysia (operated by Batik Air Malaysia).

== Environment ==
Due to piling works for touristic activity, sand mining, and logging for charcoal business, only 4.2% of Batam Island is covered in mangrove forests, a great decrease from 24% in 1970. Originally, Batam Island had 41,500 hectares of mangrove forests.

== Gallery ==
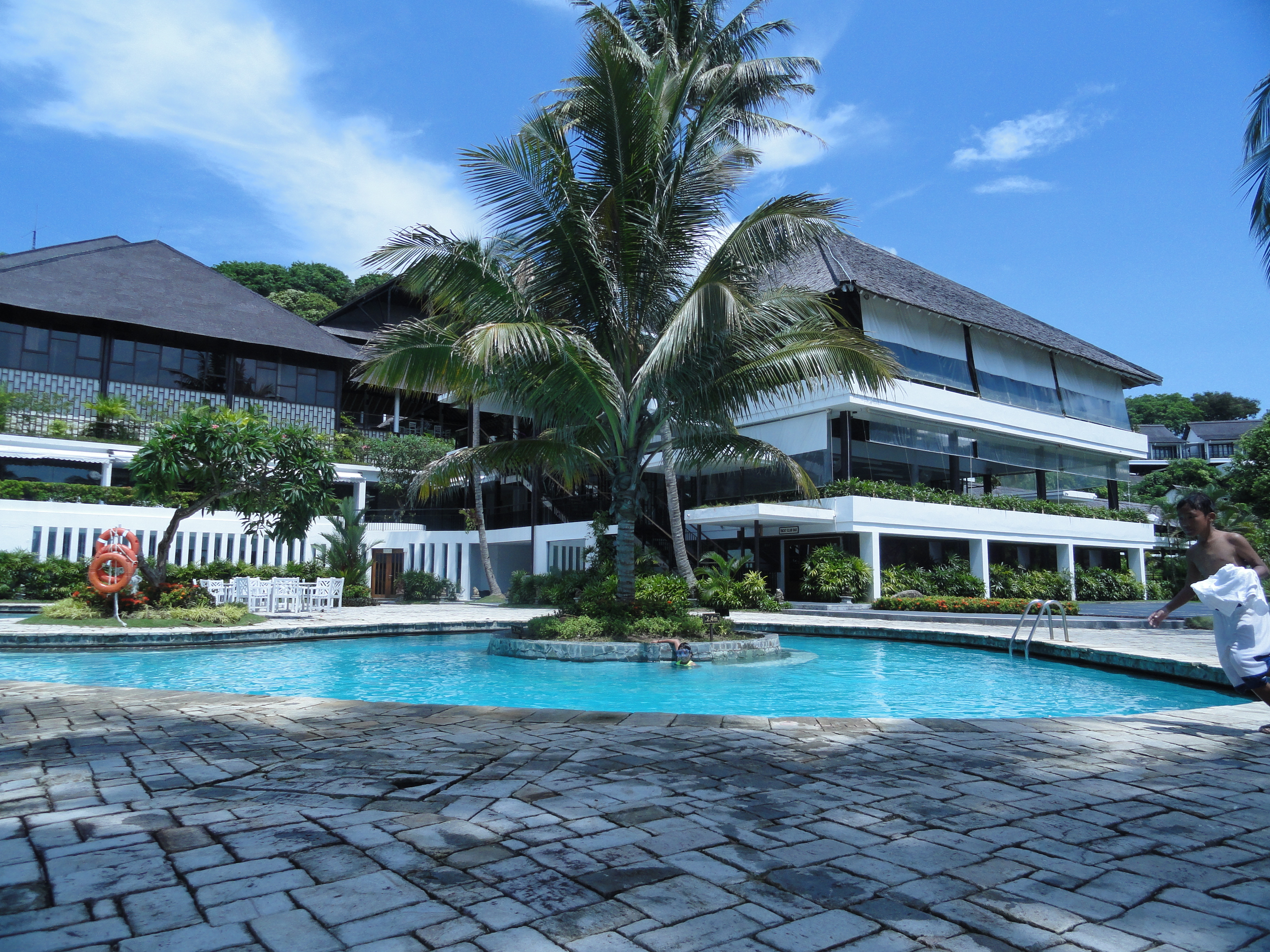
Turi Beach Resort

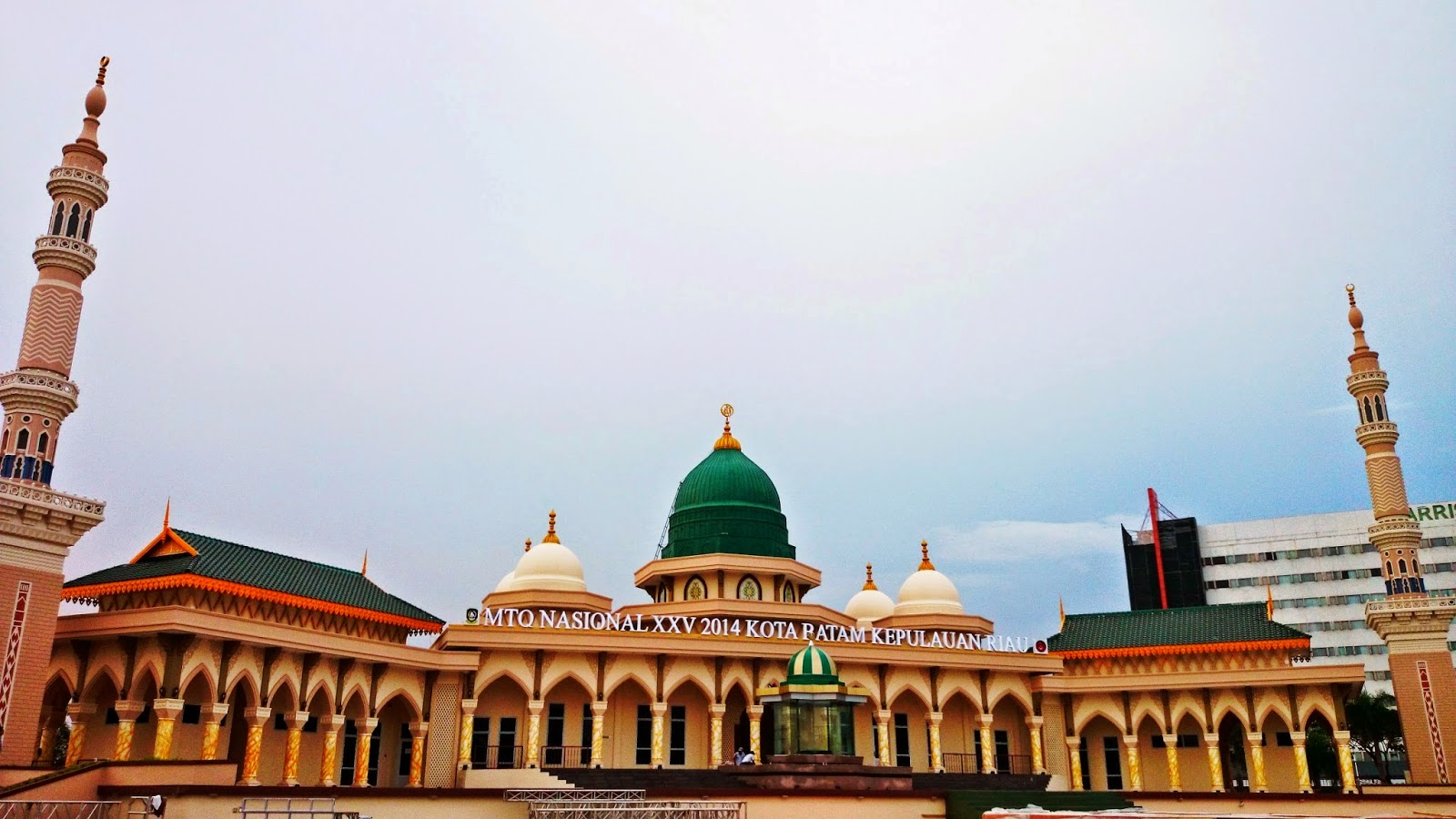
The 2014 National MTQ Building in Dataran Engku Putri, Batam Centre

Great Mosque of Batam

Pacific Palace Hotel

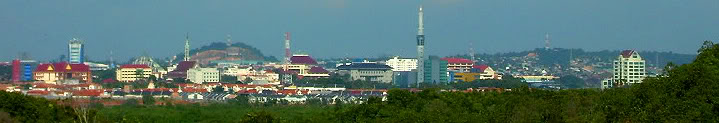
Batam Centre

Barelang Bridge

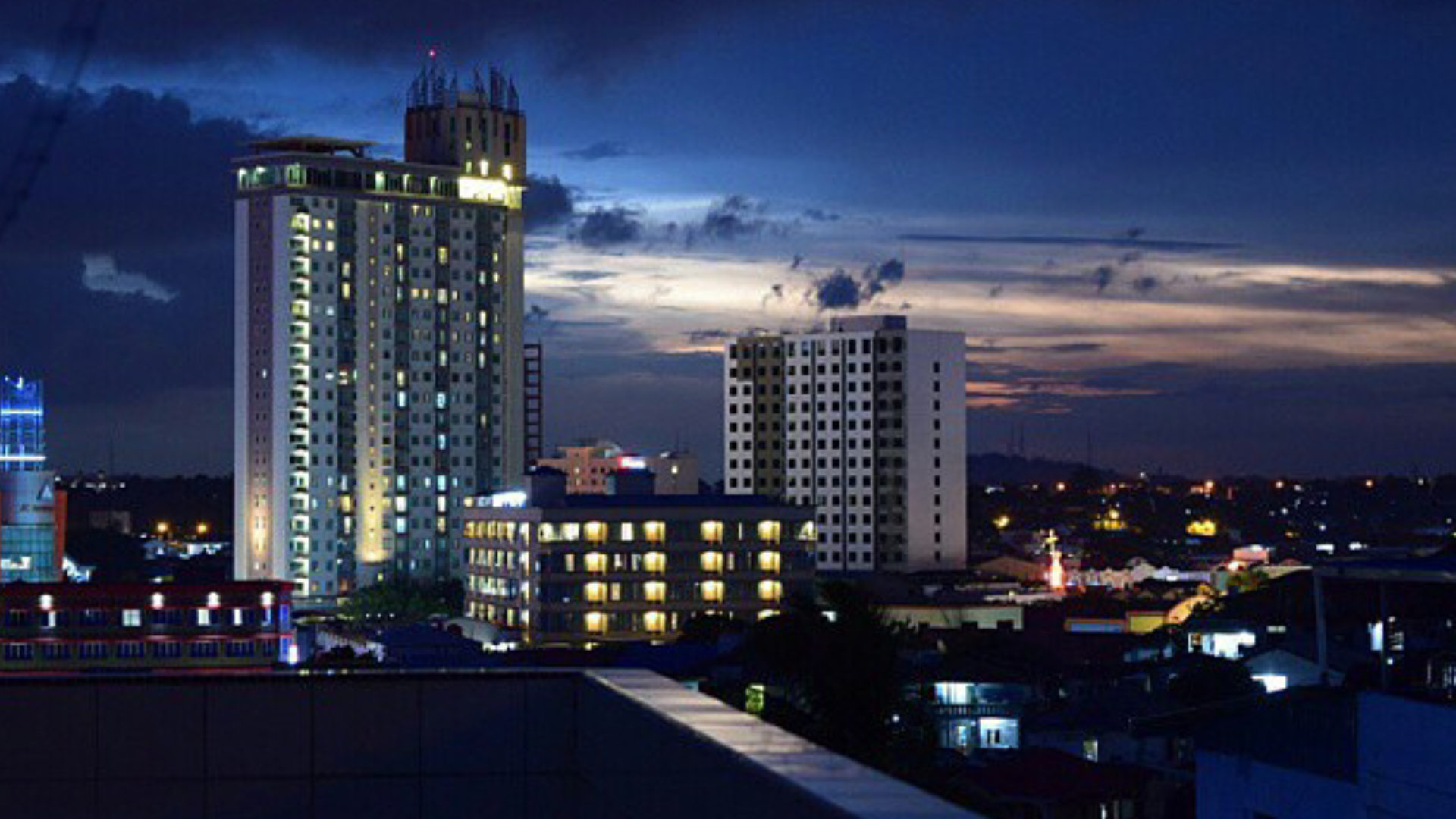
BCC Hotel Tower and iHotel Baloi

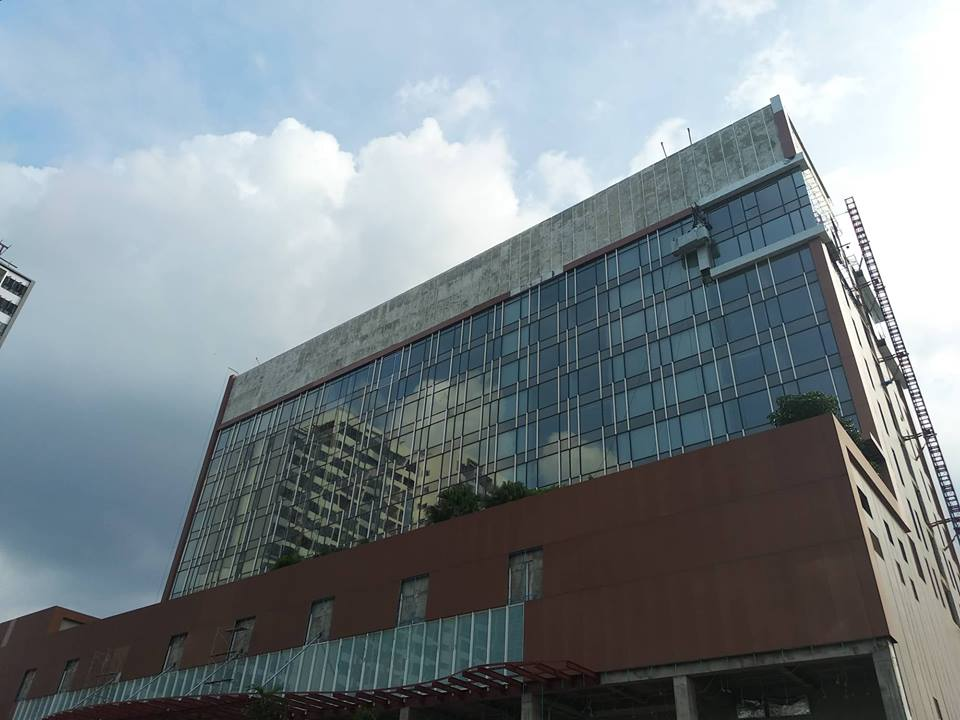
Batam Marriott Hotel Harbour Bay

== See also ==
- List of tallest buildings in Batam
- Makassar metropolitan area
