= H. Lan Thao Lam =

Interdisciplinary artist and educator (born 1968)

- Born: 1968 (age 57–58); Mỹ Tho, Vietnam
- Education: BA (Ontario College of Art); MFA (California Institute of the Arts)
- Known for: Sculpture, installation art, film, video art, mixed media
- Website: https://www.linpluslam.com/

H. Lan Thao Lam (b. 1968) is an interdisciplinary artist and educator based in New York. Examining the social memory of place, history, and architecture, their (Note: Lam uses they/them pronouns.) artistic practice spans research, object-making, installation, film, video, writing, and performance.

They have received commissions from the KW Institute for Contemporary Art, Berlin and Queens Museum, New York, and their work has been shown internationally, such as at the Busan Biennale, The Kitchen, the New Museum, and the 3rd Guangzhou Triennial. Lam was a fellow with the Whitney Independent Study Program (ISP) from 2002 to 2003.

Since 2001, Lam has worked collaboratively with artist-filmmaker Lana Lin as the artist team Lin + Lam, developing mixed media research-based projects challenging how national historical narratives are constructed, translated, and mediated.

Lam is the Director of the MFA Fine Arts Program at the Parsons School of Design at The New School.

== Career ==
Lam's earlier installations from the 1990s include works such as I don't often dream (1995), Song of A Twittering Bird (1996), and Lost in translations (1997). From 1998, Lam began work on a solo piece titled Tracing Echoes (1998–2008), a mixed media installation examining the contested nature of memory through family members' recorded recollections of the 1968 Tet Offensive.

In 1999, Lam presented a solo show titled Wouldn’t Martha Be Proud! as an artist-in-residence at Side Street Projects in Santa Monica, California. Lam developed Where Does It Go From Here? in 2001, a project investigating the US military’s napalm bomb stockpile, a leftover from the Vietnam War.

Lam met the artist-filmmaker Lana Lin in 2000. From 2001, Lam began working collaboratively with Lin as the artist team Lin + Lam, developing mixed media research-based projects challenging how national historical narratives are constructed, translated, and mediated.

For Cabinet Magazine, Lam developed Even the Trees Would Leave in collaboration with Lin in 2005, a series of photographic diptychs with narrative textual elements reflecting upon the Vietnamese refugee crisis in Hong Kong from 1975 to 2000. The work documented how the former Pillar Point refugee camp in New Territories had been transformed into recreational sites for families after 2000.

From 2002 to 2003, Lam was a fellow with the Whitney Independent Study Program (ISP) under the Studio Program.

Lam collaborated with Lin to present the multimedia installation Unidentified Vietnam at Gallery 456, New York in 2006, working with propaganda films and materials archived at the South Vietnam Embassy Collection in the US Library of Congress.

In 2008, as part of a site-specific Lin + Lam commission by the Queens Museum for Corona Plaza: Center of Everywhere v.2, Lam drew upon their prior training as a hairstylist to offer free haircuts for the community of Corona, Queens throughout the summer. Creating a video work documenting interactions with the community, Unisex (2008) was presented both at the museum and at hair salons around the neighborhood. Unisex was also later shown at a beauty parlor in Chinatown, Manhattan in 2017, curated by No Longer Empty.

While in Hong Kong in 2010, after reading about reunion tours where former refugees returned to visit their camps, Lam decided to visit their former refugee camp in Malaysia with Lin. Developing the Lin + Lam multimedia installation, Tomorrow, I Leave (2010), Lam made two or three trips to Pulau Bidong with Lin, finding ruins of their former refugee camp and another site converted into a parking lot. In Kuala Lumpur, they met a retired architect who happened to have built some of the structures of the Kuala Lumpur transit camp at Sungei Besi. Incorporating postcards, found objects, videos, and photographs, Tomorrow, I Leave (2010) was shown at 1a space at the Cattle Depot Artist Village in Hong Kong. Tomorrow, I Leave was later shown at the 2018 Busan Biennale in South Korea.

For their MacDowell Fellowship in 2017, Lam developed new sculptures for the Lin + Lam project Saxa Loquuntur, a mixed-media installation recreating antiquities collected by psychologist Sigmund Freud.

In 2019, Lam curated the exhibition Other Wise at the Gallery MC, New York, featuring artists siren eun young jung, Catalina Schliebener, Buzz Slutzky, and Trần Tín.

Lam worked with artist Sanne De Wilde in 2021 for the online project UN/MUTE-10002, which pairs New York-based artists with European artists to collaborate online, culminating in a series of video recordings.

Since 2015, Lam has taught at the Parsons School of Design, The New School, New York, currently an Assistant Professor of Fine Arts at the School of Art, Media, and Technology. Lam was previously faculty at the MFA Interdisciplinary Art program of Goddard College, Plainfield, Vermont, and they also previously taught at Cooper Union, New York, the Vermont College of Fine Arts, and Middle Tennessee State University.

== Awards ==
Lam was awarded the Media Art Grant from the Canada Council for the Arts in 2005. From 2009 to 2010, they were a fellow at the Vera List Center for Art and Politics as Lin + Lam. Lam was a MacDowell Fellow in 2017.

From 2018 to 2020, Lam was an India China Institute Faculty Fellow as Lin + Lam. In 2020, they received a commission from KW Institute for Contemporary Art for Three Missing Letters (2021).
