= Lin + Lam =

Artist duo in New York City

Lin + Lam (est. 2001) is a New York-based artist collaboration composed of Lana Lin and H. Lan Thao Lam. Lin + Lam is known for multidisciplinary research-based projects that explore immigration, political sites, and the construction of historical memory through interviews, archival materials, and found objects. The collaboration draws upon each of their backgrounds in time-based media, installation, sculpture, photography, and architecture.

Lin + Lam's 2021 film, Three Missing Letters, was screened at the San Diego Asian Film Festival, Nepal America Film Festival, Onion City Film Festival, and European Media Art Festival, Osnabrück, Germany.

Their work has been exhibited internationally at venues such as the Museum of Modern Art (MoMA), New Museum, The Kitchen, and the Queens Museum, New York, Yerba Buena Center for the Arts, San Francisco, ARKO Arts Center (Korean Arts Council), Seoul, the 3rd Guangzhou Triennial, China, and the 2018 Busan Biennale.

Lin + Lam has received support from the Canada Council for the Arts, the New York State Council on the Arts, the Vera List Center for Art and Politics, the KW Institute for Contemporary Art Production Series, and the India China Institute at The New School, New York.

== History ==
=== Early collaborations (2001–2005) ===
Lana Lin and H. Lan Thao Lam first met in 2000, finding shared interests in politics of feminism, postcoloniality, and critical discourse. Their social circles overlapped from both of their experiences with the Whitney Museum Independent Study Program, which Lin did from 2000 to 2001 and Lam did from 2002 to 2003. Lin and Lam found their respective backgrounds in moving image and installation art to be overlapping and complementary. Both were further interested in examining how their different backgrounds and life experiences could be generative in the creation of work.

From 2001, the duo began working together to develop mixed media research-based projects challenging how national historical narratives are constructed, translated, and mediated.

For Cabinet Magazine, Lin and Lam jointly developed Even the Trees Would Leave in 2005, a series of photographic diptychs with narrative textual elements reflecting upon the Vietnamese refugee crisis in Hong Kong from 1975 to 2000. The work documented how the former Pillar Point refugee camp in New Territories had been transformed into recreational sites for families after 2000.

In February 2005, Lin and Lam were invited to participate in Solidarity UNLIMITED? Liberty, Equality, Fraternity organized by the Danish collective rum46, an event consisting of talks, exhibitions, interventions, and a companion publication. Together, they produced an installation with performance This is Not Me (2005), using the cutout remains of portrait photographs disposed by the Taiwan Police Department, after faces were punched out from these photographs for use in ID cards. Through the photographic remains collected in Taiwan, a nation not internationally recognized, the work considered ideas of non-identity and statelessness. This is Not Me was later re-configured for publication in the journal Rethinking Marxism, providing additional context about the faceless photographs.

Another collaboration titled Dark Meat or White Meat? was presented in October 2005 as a single-channel video installation at the Vera List Center for Art and Politics in The New School. The video was accompanied by mock lecture notes written on a chalkboard.

=== As Lin + Lam (2006 onwards) ===
In 2006, Lin and Lam collaborated to present the multimedia installation Unidentified Vietnam at Gallery 456, New York, working with propaganda films and materials archived at the South Vietnam Embassy Collection in the US Library of Congress. With this exhibition, the pair chose to 'come out' as the artist team Lin + Lam. The name "Lin + Lam" was chosen as it recognized their individuality and each of their distinct voices within the collaboration, rather than collapsing them together into a neat, singular identity.

Unidentified Vietnam (2006) was in progress when Lin received a Fulbright Grant to create a work in Taiwan, which became the video essay, Departure (2006). Departure focused on the three postcolonial cities of Taipei, Shanghai, and Hanoi. In 2009, Departure was shown as a three-channel installation at Joseph Gross Gallery, Tucson, Arizona, an exhibition in conjunction with the University of Arizona's lecture series titled Transculturations: Cultural Hybridity in American Art.

Lin + Lam developed a successor to Unidentified Vietnam later in 2007, creating the 16 mm film Unidentified Vietnam No. 18 (2007). Taking its name from the films numbered 1 to 17 that are marked "unidentified" in the Embassy of South Vietnam Collection at the US Library of Congress, Unidentified Vietnam No. 18 questions what comes after experiences of colonialism and imperialism. The 30-minute film examines the contested relationship between Vietnam and the US, questioning the failure of US intervention and the dangers of its repetition.

In 2008, as part of a site-specific commission by the Queens Museum for Corona Plaza: Center of Everywhere v.2, Lin + Lam offered free haircuts for the community of Corona, Queens throughout the summer, drawing on Lam's skills as a former hairstylist. Creating a video work documenting interactions with the community, Unisex (2008) was presented both at the museum and at hair salons around the neighborhood. Unisex was also later shown at a beauty parlor in Chinatown, Manhattan in 2017.

While in Hong Kong in 2010, after reading about reunion tours where former refugees returned to visit their camps, Lam decided to visit their former refugee camp in Malaysia together with Lin. Developing the multimedia installation, Tomorrow, I Leave (2010), Lin + Lam made two or three trips to Pulau Bidong, finding ruins of Lam's former refugee camp and another site converted into a parking lot. Incorporating postcards, found objects, videos, and photographs, Lin + Lam first exhibited Tomorrow, I Leave at 1a space at the Cattle Depot Artist Village in Hong Kong. Tomorrow, I Leave was later shown at the 2018 Busan Biennale in South Korea.

In 2010, Lin + Lam developed the web project Change Encounters, with visitors accessing an archive of cultural and historical predictive devices through a random number generator, based on the 64 hexagrams of the ancient Chinese divination text, the I Ching. Change Encounters was developed by Lin + Lam as Fellows at the Vera List Center for Art and Politics, responding to their focus theme of "Speculating on Change".

For Lam's MacDowell Fellowship in 2017, new sculptures were developed for the Lin + Lam project Saxa Loquuntur, a mixed-media installation recreating antiquities collected by psychologist Sigmund Freud. As part of Saxa Loquuntur is the video work, After Engelman (2017), which examines the present conditions of what is now the Sigmund Freud Museum in Vienna.

In 2020, Lin + Lam was commissioned by KW Institute for Contemporary Art for the experimental documentary film Three Missing Letters (2021). Three Missing Letters was screened at the San Diego Asian Film Festival, Nepal America Film Festival, Onion City Film Festival, and European Media Art Festival, Osnabrück, Germany.

== Selected works ==
=== Unidentified Vietnam (2006) ===
As the first collaboration under the name Lin + Lam, Unidentified Vietnam (2006) is an umbrella project consisting of a multimedia installation and a 30-minute film, Unidentified Vietnam No. 18 (2007). The work began with research into propaganda films and materials archived at the South Vietnam Embassy Collection in the US Library of Congress. Combining the use of analog media like photographs, films, and sculptural configurations, with digital technologies, the installation references the transitional nature of a regime change. The installation begins with entrance signage containing an article from The Washington Star, detailing the fall of Saigon and the consequent acquisition of materials by the Library of Congress.

The first component of the installation, 24 frames = 1 second, comprises 24 film stills capturing a filmic wipe, a transition common to propaganda films of the time, foregrounding the nature of transitional moments that were not intended to be central to the original material. A sculptural component, Pupils of Democracy, consists of a projector stacked atop books on Vietnamese history, with a 16mm film loop projection of a figure erasing an imaginary blackboard, emphasizing a failure to erase the past. Continuing upon this theme of erasure is Library of Congress Cleaning Crew, a nearly life-sized video projection of the Library's nightly cleaning crew. The final component was a partial imitation of a traditional library card catalog, with subject headings containing key phrases from interviews compiled by Lin + Lam, pointing to the impossibility of complete comprehension even across processes of archival, preservation, and historicization.

For the installation and film (Unidentified Vietnam No. 18), Lam further reenacted male and female parts from propaganda films as a form of drag, playing the role of President Ngo Dinh Diem, for example. Addressing their interest in ideas of translation and multiple interpretations of the past and present, Lin + Lam appropriated and cited popular music by including Bang Bang as sung by Vietnamese singer Thanh Lan in French, alongside Cher's cover of the same song.

=== Tomorrow, I Leave (2010) ===
Tomorrow, I Leave (2010) is a multimedia installation by Lin + Lam incorporating postcards, found objects, videos, and photographs. As part of research for the project, Lin + Lam made two or three trips to Pulau Bidong, finding ruins of Lam's former refugee camp and another site converted into a parking lot. Lin + Lam explore the notion of returning and tourism with Tomorrow, I Leave, making postcards from photographs they had taken at the former refugee camps in Malaysia, and sending them back to the exhibition site in Hong Kong. Invoking the touristic medium of postal service, the use of postcards also references the preferred mode of communication for some Vietnamese refugees to inform people that they had safely escaped.

The video installation includes the song Biển nhớ by Vietnamese singer Khánh Ly, which gives the work its title. A 1970s Vietnamese pop song regularly played over camp intercom systems, the first line of the song is "Ngay mai em di" meaning "Tomorrow, I leave," carrying connotations of letting go while thinking about the ones left behind.

=== Three Missing Letters (2021) ===
A 25-minute experimental documentary, Three Missing Letters (2021) reimagines three lost letters from a failed 1934 experiment in delivering mail by rocket at the border of India and Nepal, based on the story of India's rocket mail pioneer Stephen H. Smith. Through the use of digitized maps, archive documents, stop motion animation, and re-staged tableaux, Lin + Lam speculates on the contents of these letters. The film examines communication technologies between nation states, and how the very concept of the "nation" is dependent on communication. Emphasizing the labor of Indian and Chinese postmen delivering mail across the Himalayan mountain pass Nathu La, Lin + Lam highlight the role of inconstant diplomatic relations in communications, and the ability for Tibetan refugees to remain in touch with families even when no other contact is permitted.

== Awards ==
Lin + Lam has received support from the Canada Council for the Arts and the New York State Council on the Arts.

Lin + Lam was a Fellow at the Vera List Center for Art and Politics from 2009 to 2011. From 2018 to 2020, Lin + Lam was an India China Institute Faculty Fellow. In 2020, they received a commission from KW Institute for Contemporary Art for Three Missing Letters (2021).
