= Art in the Camps =

Art project by Vietnamese refugees in Hong Kong

Art in the Camps was a three-year project between 1988 and 1991 that provided creative workshops to Vietnamese refugees in Hong Kong detention camps. Organized by Evelyna Liang Yee Woo of Garden Streams — Hong Kong Fellowship of Christian Artists and funded by the United Nations, Art in the Camps provided workshops on painting, drawing, dancing, singing and poetry-writing to Vietnamese refugees, primarily those at the Whitehead Detention Camp in Sha Tin, New Territories. By 1991, the project amassed between 600 and 800 pieces of artworks and writings by Vietnamese refugees in its collection.

In the late 2000s, the collection was sent to the International Institute of Social History in The Netherlands for better preservation, but because of renewed interest by the Chinese University of Hong Kong’s Fine Arts Department in 2017, its return to Hong Kong has since been under discussion.

The collection has been a part of two exhibitions in Hong Kong: C.A.R.E. (Local Vietnamese Community Art Re-encountered) at Lingnan University in 2008 and Nàng Tự Do – The archive of Art In the Camps (Garden Streams) at the Chinese University of Hong Kong in 2020.

== Vietnamese refugees in Hong Kong ==
On 3 May 1975, the first group of Vietnamese refugees landed in Hong Kong following the Fall of Saigon on 30 April 1975. In 1982, with the passing of the Immigration (Amendment) Bill 1982 by the Hong Kong Government, Vietnamese refugee camps became closed detention centers. Between 1975 and 1995, 223,302 Vietnamese refugees landed in Hong Kong, with most resettling in other countries. The last Vietnamese refugee camp in Hong Kong, Pillar Point, was closed on 31 May 2000.

== Art in the Camps by Garden Streams ==
Garden Streams — Hong Kong Fellowship of Christian Artists is an artist collective founded by Evelyna Liang Yee Woo. In 1988, Liang and Garden Streams initiated the Art in the Camps project with funding from The UN Refugee Agency. Its initial focus was to provide workshops to refugee children at Whitehead Detention Camp, the largest refugee camp in Hong Kong which held more than 24,000 detainees in the 1980s. According to Liang, the concept of Art in the Camps was "to provide a way for refugee children inside the camps to enjoy art”. Art in the Camps expanded their programming to include adult refugees after securing more funding. Refugees who were previous teachers, architects, artists, designers, lawyers or writers in Vietnam were provided with materials and management support to be able to run art programs in the camps themselves. This led to the publication of Tự Do Magazine (Freedom Magazine) which circulated within the camps and provided a channel for the literate to exchange and communicate.

Following the conclusion of the project, around 600 to 800 pieces of artwork and writing by Vietnamese refugees were put under Liang's care for two decades before they were sent to the International Institute of Social History in Amsterdam for better preservation. An interest in Hong Kong reacquiring the collection was put forward by researchers at the Chinese University of Hong Kong in 2017.

In 2014, Professor Sophia Law Suk Mun (羅淑敏) published her book, The Invisible Citizens of Hong Kong: Art and Stories of Vietnamese Boatpeople, about Vietnamese refugees in Hong Kong and the Art in the Camps project.

== Exhibitions ==
=== C.A.R.E. (Local Vietnamese Community Art Re-encountered) ===
In April 2008, Liang and Professor Law curated the exhibition C.A.R.E. (Local Vietnamese Community Art Re-encountered) at Lingnan University. With the theme "Art in Adversity," the exhibition showed over 200 pieces from the Art in the Camps collection before its migration to the International Institute of Social History. The exhibition invited artists and former participants of the Art in the Camps project to create new artworks that reflect on their time in detention camps. Three films were also shown: There to Here (2005) by Van Tran, Journey from the Fall (2007) by Ham Tran and To Liv(e) (1992) by Evans Chan.

=== Nàng Tự Do – The archive of Art In the Camps (Garden Streams) ===
Nàng Tự Do – The archive of Art In the Camps (Garden Streams) was an exhibition curated by Harry Leung Ho Yin of the Chinese University of Hong Kong, co-organized by the Chinese University of Hong Kong's Department of Fine Arts and Library, along with Garden Streams and Art For All. It was held at the Chinese University of Hong Kong's Library from October 2020 to April 2021 and was supported by the Hong Kong Arts Development Council. The title of the exhibition was derived from the Vietnamese phrase "Nàng Tự Do” which means “Miss Freedom” in English, referencing the Tự Do Magazine (Freedom Magazine) that was published and circulated by Vietnamese refugees while they were in the camps.

About 50 paintings from the Art in the Camps archive were included in the exhibition, along with photographs, newspaper clippings and other historical documents. Artists from Hong Kong and overseas were invited to react to the archive. Parts of the Tự Do Magazine were also translated into English and Cantonese for the first time. According to its press release, "[t]he exhibition aims to discuss the relationship between “refugees” and contemporary society by reviewing this unique piece of almost forgotten history."
