= Siu A Chau =

Uninhabited island of Hong Kong

Coordinates: 22°10′57″N 113°54′44″E

小鴉洲
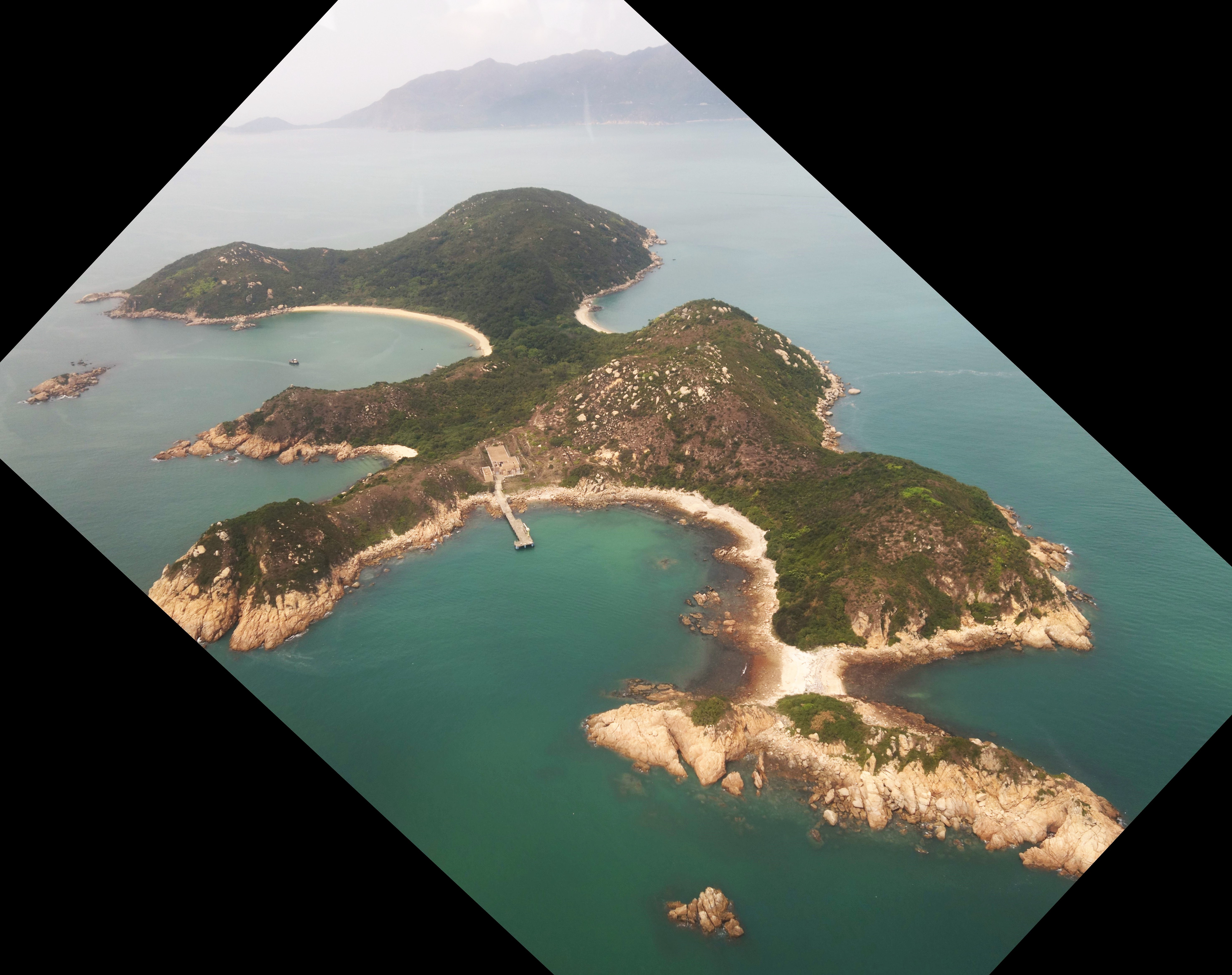
- Aerial view of Siu A Chau looking towards the South coast of Lantau Island

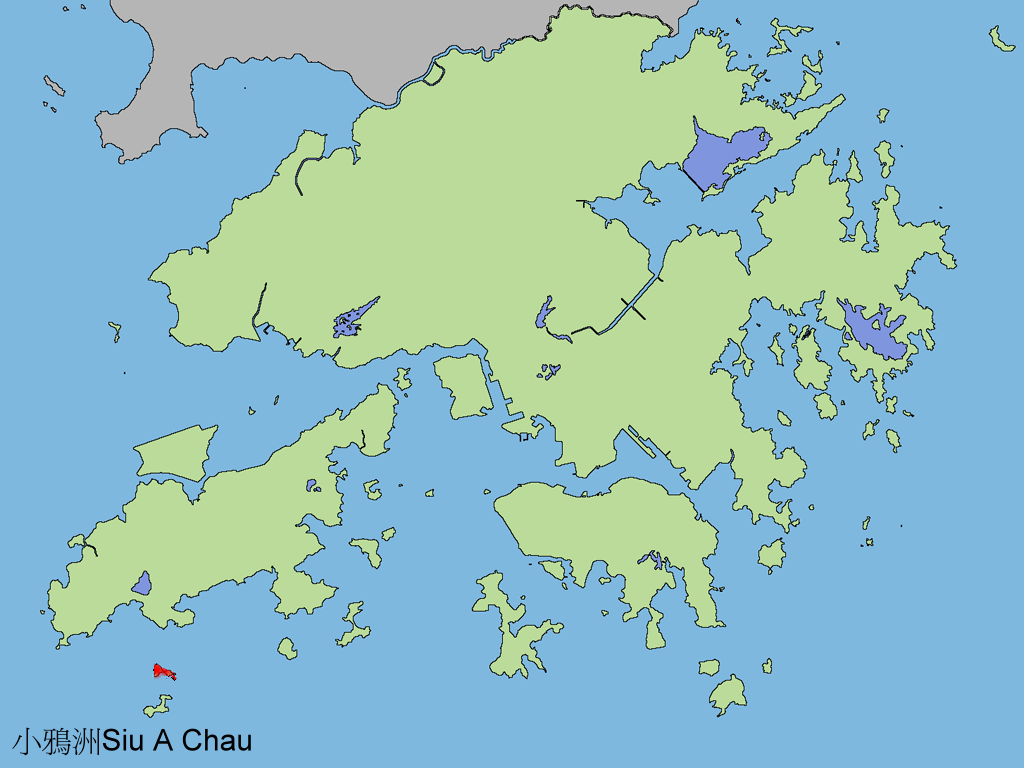
- Location of Siu A Chau in Hong Kong

Geography
- Location: South of Lantau Island
- Highest elevation: 74 m (243 ft)

Administration
- Hong Kong

Siu A Chau
- Traditional Chinese: 小鴉洲
- Simplified Chinese: 小鸦洲
Transcriptions
Standard Mandarin
- Hanyu Pinyin: Xiǎoyāzhōu
Yue: Cantonese
- Yale Romanization: Síu ā jāu
- Jyutping: Siu^{2} aa^{1} zau^{1}

Siu A Chau (Chinese: 小鴉洲) is an uninhabited island of Hong Kong, part of the Soko Islands group, located south of Lantau Island.

== Geography ==
Siu A Chau is the northernmost and the second largest of the Soko Islands, after Tai A Chau. It is dumbbell-shaped and has a rugged indented coastline with steep slopes. The highest point of the island is at 74 meters. A beach lies to the south, and another to the north of the island.

== Administration ==
Siu A Chau is a recognized village under the New Territories Small House Policy.

== History ==
In 1937, Walter Schofield, then a Cadet Officer in the Hong Kong Civil Service, wrote that Siu A Chau was "another settlement of early man" and that it had a "fishing village of huts very different from ordinary Chinese dwellings" at the time of writing.

== Features ==
There is a temple on the south side of the island.

A low-level radioactive waste (LLRW) facility began operation at Siu A Chau in July 2005. Low-level radioactive wastes which had previously been stored in disused tunnels, two factories and five hospitals were subsequently transferred to the Siu A Chau facility. Part of this waste was relocated from the disused Mount Parish air-raid tunnels at Queen's Road East, in Wan Chai. The 55 m^{3} of LLRW stored there had raised objections. The opening ceremony of the facility was held in June 2006.
