= Whitehead Detention Centre =

Vietnamese refugee detention centre in Hong Kong

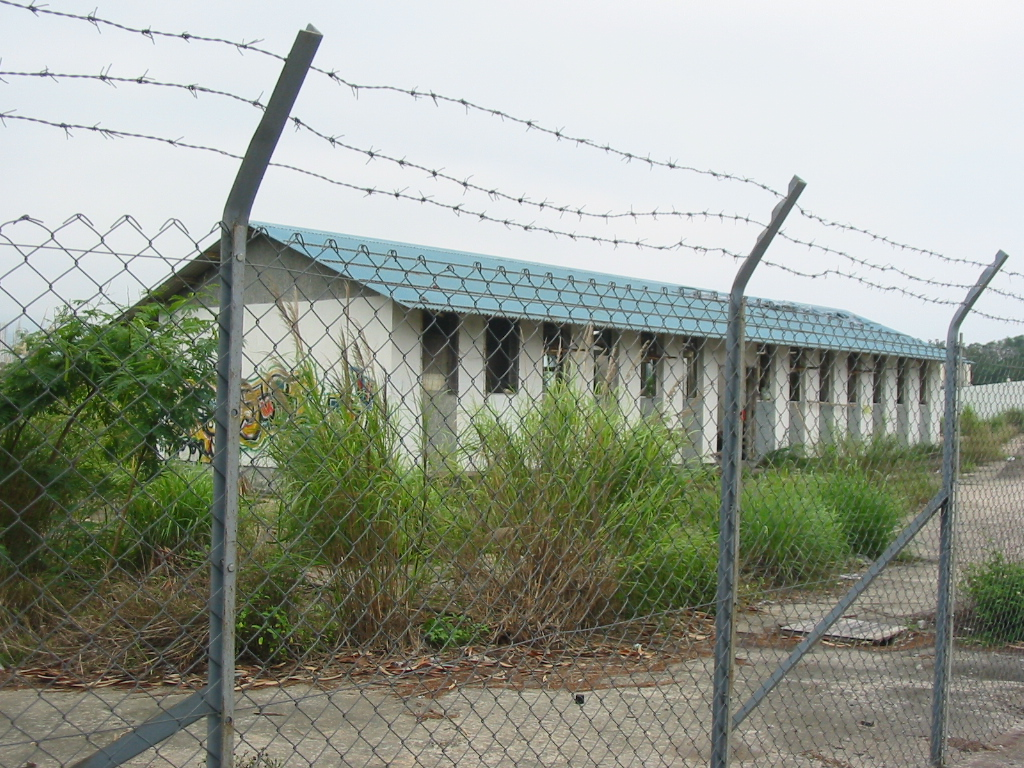
A barracks inside the Whitehead Detention Center (2008)

Whitehead Detention Centre was a high-security detention facility for Vietnamese boat people located in Whitehead, Ma On Shan, in the Sha Tin District of the New Territories, Hong Kong. It was established by the Hong Kong Government in response to the influx of Vietnamese boat people and was administered by the Correctional Services Department. The centre opened in January 1989, with its first detainees transferred from the Harbour Detention Centre and the Argyle Street Detention Centre.

As a purpose-built detention centre, Whitehead Detention Centre continued to receive Vietnamese boat people after its opening, and its facilities were expanded over time to accommodate the growing population. At its peak, it was the largest detention centre in Hong Kong, housing more than 20,000 detainees. The centre was the scene of several major riots, the most notable of which occurred on 10 May 1996. The disturbance caused extensive fire damage to much of the camp, seriously injured numerous detainees and staff, and allowed more than 200 boat people to escape amid the chaos. Following the implementation of the Orderly Repatriation Programme by the Hong Kong Government, the centre’s population gradually declined. It was closed in June 1997, and the remaining detainees were transferred to the Sai Kung Man Yee Detention Centre.The northern part of the site was subsequently leased by the Hong Kong Government on a short-term basis and later redeveloped as the Whitehead Golf Driving Range.The southern portion was temporarily allocated to the Hong Kong Road Research Institute of the Hong Kong Polytechnic University for research purposes. Between 2019 and 2020, the site was redeveloped for private residential use and became the housing developments known as Cloud Sea and The Sea Crest. Subsequently, part of the site was approved for use by City University of Hong Kong for the construction of student residences.

== History ==
Following the end of the Vietnam War in 1975, the number of Vietnamese boat people fleeing the country increased significantly, with many seeking refuge in Hong Kong. To accommodate the influx, the Hong Kong Government established more than a dozen detention centres across the territory under the administration of the Correctional Services Department, although available facilities soon proved inadequate. In 1988, the Government began exploring the establishment of large-scale detention centres at Whitehead in Ma On Shan and at the High Island Reservoir area in Sai Kung. On 24 August, the Finance Committee of the Legislative Councilapproved a funding allocation of HK$175.6 million for the first phase of the Whitehead Detention Centre project. The plan included the construction of two accommodation blocks with a capacity of 4,800 detainees, while reserving land for two additional blocks. Upon completion of all phases, the centre was expected to accommodate up to 9,600 people. Construction was completed in December 1988. On 24 January 1989, more than 2,000 Vietnamese boat people were transferred in batches from the Harbour Detention Centre, including detainees housed aboard the Minhua (formerly the Yau Ma Tei Ferry), under the jurisdiction of the Harbour Detention Center of the Civil Aid Service and from the Argyle Street Detention Centre. They became the first detainees to be accommodated at Whitehead Detention Centre.

However, the population of the centre soon increased rapidly, reaching approximately 4,100 detainees. In May 1989, the Correctional Services Department erected temporary accommodation facilities to cope with the growing demand, ultimately expanding the centre’s capacity to more than 18,000 places. By July, the centre had undergone further expansion, and its population had risen to more than 8,000. Despite this growth, only three correctional officers were assigned to supervise every 1,000 detainees, prompting concerns among local residents. Opposition to the expansion plans culminated in a press conference calling for further development of the facility to be halted. Although the issue attracted the attention of the Sha Tin District Council, the centre continued to receive additional Vietnamese boat people. By the end of September, its population had reached approximately 14,000. As subsequent phases of construction were completed later that year, further arrivals pushed the population beyond 20,000, making Whitehead Detention Centre the largest detention facility for Vietnamese boat people in Hong Kong.

The large detainee population at the centre gave rise to frequent tensions and violent confrontations among the Vietnamese boat people. On 27 September 1989, a dispute between rival groups escalated into a riot after several detainees used improvised weapons to attack others from opposing factions. Riot police were deployed to restore order, and 24 people were arrested. The individuals involved were subsequently prosecuted under the Public Order Ordinance and convicted of rioting. The case marked the first successful prosecution for rioting since the offence had been incorporated into the ordinance in 1970. In February 1990, two large-scale fights broke out at the centre, requiring police intervention to restore order. The incidents resulted in injuries to numerous detainees and correctional staff. On 27 February 1991, clashes erupted between North Vietnamese and South Vietnamese detainees over a debt dispute. In response, the Correctional Services Department’s Emergency Response Team fired more than 40 tear-gas canisters to disperse the crowd. Following a deadly incident at the Shek Kong Detention Centre, which was operated by the police and resulted in 24 deaths, the authorities decided to segregate detainees at Whitehead according to their place of origin and religious affiliation.

Subsequently, the Hong Kong Government implemented the Orderly Repatriation Programme and accelerated efforts to close refugee facilities in the territory. These measures prompted strong opposition from Vietnamese boat people awaiting repatriation in Hong Kong. In April 1994, detainees at Whitehead Detention Centre protested against compulsory repatriation by launching a hunger strike, which later escalated into a riot. Some detainees barricaded themselves inside sections of the camp and started fires. On 7 April, the Correctional Services Department, assisted by the police, deployed more than 1,000 personnel to restore order at the centre. They encountered substantial resistance from detainees, and police officers fired more than 500 tear-gas canisters during the operation. More than 200 people were injured, including nearly 100 who suffered burns associated with the use of tear gas. On 22 May 1995, another major confrontation occurred between detainees and police officers at the centre. During the disturbance, police fired approximately 3,250 tear-gas rounds and a number of live rounds in an effort to regain control of the facility.

On 10 May 1996, a major riot broke out at Whitehead Detention Centre, the most serious disturbance since the facility’s establishment. Nearly 1,000 Vietnamese boat people awaiting repatriation reportedly armed themselves with improvised weapons, stormed several accommodation blocks, and set fires throughout the centre. The unrest affected most of the accommodation blocks, damaged 53 vehicles, and resulted in 14 correctional officers being taken hostage. In response, the authorities deployed large numbers of police officers and Correctional Services Department personnel to restore order. During the operation, more than 1,800 tear-gas canisters were fired and numerous warning shots were discharged. The disturbance resulted in substantial casualties and extensive damage to the facility. More than 200 detainees escaped from the centre during the riot and fled into the surrounding Ma On Shan area. Police subsequently established roadblocks and conducted search operations, causing significant traffic disruption. The incident also affected candidates sitting the Hong Kong Certificate of Education Examination, as some students residing in Ma On Shan were unable to reach their designated examination centres. The Hong Kong Examinations Authority therefore arranged alternative examination venues within the district and later made special arrangements for affected candidates. On 14 May, officers of the Correctional Services Department and the police conducted a large-scale search operation at the centre, resulting in the arrest of 35 detainees. Approximately 2,000 improvised weapons, together with firearms and ammunition, were seized, representing the largest cache recovered from the facility. Several detainees who had escaped during the riot were also recaptured.

Despite the continuing unrest, the Hong Kong Government maintained its repatriation policy. Later that year, the Vietnamese Government assured the Hong Kong authorities and the then British Foreign Secretary, Malcolm Rifkind, that measures would be taken to prevent further departures from Vietnam and to expedite the return of Vietnamese nationals remaining in Hong Kong. As a result, the number of Vietnamese boat people in the territory declined rapidly. In December 1996, the Hong Kong Government announced plans to close Whitehead Detention Centre on 3 January 1997 and transfer the remaining detainees to Sai Kung Man Yee Detention Centre. The closure was subsequently postponed, and the facility ultimately ceased operations in June 1997. Its remaining detainees were transferred to Man Yee, bringing Whitehead’s role in the detention and repatriation of Vietnamese boat people to an end. The former site was subsequently redeveloped. The northern portion became the Whitehead Golf Driving Range, while other parts of the site were later converted to residential and institutional uses.

== Influence ==
Like Sai Kung Man Yee Detention Centre, Whitehead Detention Centre was one of the principal facilities established to accommodate Vietnamese boat people in Hong Kong and formed an important part of the territory’s detention and repatriation system. However, severe overcrowding at the centre led to significant sewage-disposal problems, contributing to environmental degradation in nearby Tolo Harbour. The pollution reportedly caused large-scale clam mortality along adjacent shorelines and reduced local fishery yields, prompting complaints from fishermen in the area.Local fishing communities also participated in demonstrations opposing the construction and expansion of detention facilities for Vietnamese boat people. Following the closure of the detention centre, the site remained largely vacant for a period of time. After the publication of 2017 Policy Address, then Secretary for Home Affairs, Lau Kong-wah, stated that the Government was studying the possibility of developing part of the former Whitehead site into a major sports complex. The proposed development would have included facilities for ice skating, baseball and cricket, and would have been among the largest sports venues in Hong Kong after Kai Tak Sports Park.
