= Ma Chau =

Uninhabited outlying island of Hong Kong

孖洲
- Interactive map of Ma Chau

Geography
- Location: South of Lantau Island
- Coordinates: 22°10′20.1″N 113°54′02.1″E
- Archipelago: Soko Islands
- Total islands: 1
- Area: 5.14 km^{2} (1.98 sq mi)
- Length: 0.470 km (0.292 mi)
- Width: 0.259 km (0.1609 mi)
- Coastline: 1.570 km (0.9756 mi)

Administration
- Hong Kong
- District: Islands District

Demographics
- Population: 0

Ma Chau island (Chinese: 孖洲, not to be confused with Ma Shi Chau island), is an uninhabited outlying island of Hong Kong located in the Soko Islands group about 4km south to Lantau Island.

Since June 2022, Ma Chau Island is designated as part of South Lantau Marine Park. The park aims to protect the Chinese White Dolphins and Finless Porpoises population around the Soko Islands.

== Geology ==
According to the Civil Engineering Services Department, Ma Chau Island is composed mostly of Fan Lau Porphyritic Granite.
