= Tau Lo Chau =

Uninhabited island of Hong Kong

頭顱洲
- Interactive map of Tau Lo Chau

Geography
- Location: south of Lantau Island
- Coordinates: 22°9′14″N 113°55′21″E

Administration
- Hong Kong

Demographics
- Population: Uninhabited

Tau Lo Chau
- Traditional Chinese: 頭顱洲
- Simplified Chinese: 头颅洲
Transcriptions
Standard Mandarin
- Hanyu Pinyin: Tóulúzhōu
Yue: Cantonese
- Jyutping: tau4 lou4 zau1

Tau Lo Chau (Chinese: 頭顱洲) is an uninhabited island of Hong Kong, part of the Soko Islands group, located south of Lantau Island.
