= Vera G. List =

American art collector and philanthropist

- Born: Vera Glaser; January 6, 1908; Brookline, Massachusetts
- Died: October 10, 2002 (aged 94); Greenwich, Connecticut
- Education: Simmons College
- Spouse: Albert A. List (m. 1930; died 1987)
- Children: 4
- Awards: National Medal of Arts 1996

Vera G. List (January 6, 1908 – October 10, 2002) was an American art collector and philanthropist. She was awarded a 1996 National Medal of Arts.

== Life ==
She grew up in Brookline, Massachusetts. She attended Simmons College. In 1930 she married Albert A. List and they moved to New York City in 1945. Her husband Albert List, died on September 12, 1987, due to heart failure. She had four daughters and 12 grandchildren.

Vera List died in Greenwich, Connecticut, on October 10, 2002, aged 94.

== Philanthropy ==
She gave to the Metropolitan Opera, Mount Sinai Hospital, the Jewish Theological Seminary, the Jewish Museum, The New School, Massachusetts Institute of Technology, Brown University, Swarthmore College, and American Academy in Berlin. She help found the New Museum of Contemporary Art. She is the namesake of the Vera List Center for Art and Politics at The New School, and the List Visual Arts Center at MIT.
