= Lana Lin =

Artist, filmmaker, and scholar in New York City

- Born: 1966 (age 59–60); Montreal, Canada
- Education: BA (University of Iowa, 1988); MFA (Bard College, 1996); PhD (New York University, 2015)
- Known for: Experimental film, video art, documentary, mixed media
- Movement: Contemporary art
- Awards: 2000–01: Studio Program Fellow, Whitney ISP; 2019: Best Feature Documentary, San Diego Asian Film Festival; 2019: Favorite Experimental Film, BlackStar Film Festival
- Website: https://www.lanalin.com/

Lana Lin (b. 1966) is a filmmaker, artist, and scholar based in New York City. Since the early 1990s, she has made experimental films, videos, and documentaries that examine the politics of identity and cultural translation, informed by the poetic and conceptual qualities of moving image media.

Lin's film The Cancer Journals Revisited (2018) won Best Feature Documentary at the 2019 San Diego Asian Film Festival and Favorite Experimental Film at the 2019 BlackStar Film Festival, Philadelphia. Lin is also the author of Freud's Jaw and Other Lost Objects: Fractured Subjectivity in the Face of Cancer (New York: Fordham University Press, 2017).

Her works have been screened and exhibited internationally, including the Museum of Modern Art (MoMA) and the Whitney Museum, New York, the National Gallery of Art in Washington, D.C., the Chinese Taipei Film Archive, BAMcinemaFest in Brooklyn, and the Gasworks Gallery in London. Lin was a fellow at the Whitney Independent Study Program (ISP) from 2000 to 2001.

Since 2001, Lin has worked collaboratively with artist H. Lan Thao Lam as the artist team Lin + Lam, developing mixed media research-based projects concerning the construction of history and collective memory.

Lin is a professor at The New School, New York City.

== Early life and education ==
Lin was born in Montreal, Canada in 1966. Lin is of Taiwanese descent, with both her parents being from Taiwan. When she was two years old, Lin's family moved from Canada to the US where she grew up, living in the Chicago suburb, Naperville, Illinois. As such, Lin identifies as Taiwanese American or Asian American in nationality.

In 1988, Lin obtained a BA in Communication studies with an emphasis in Film Production from the University of Iowa, Iowa City. The same year, she came to New York to work on a documentary for the Merce Cunningham Dance Foundation, also taking on production assistant roles on other film sets. Lin then attended Bard College where she obtained an MFA in Film in 1996. At Bard, Lin was affiliated with an emerging group of artists and filmmakers, such as Matthew Buckingham, Sadie Benning, Jennifer Montgomery, and Julie Zando.

Lin spent several years studying psychoanalysis at the National Psychological Association for Psychoanalysis (NPAP), later bringing this knowledge into her art and research. She later earned her PhD in Media, Culture, and Communication at New York University in 2015.

In terms of gender, Lin identifies as queer.

== Career ==
Lin has made experimental films, documentaries, and videos since the early 1990s. Lin made several 16 mm found footage films in 1992, such as Sphere:Circle:Round, Through the Door, and I Begin to Know You. Her found footage films were included in William C. Wees' 1993 book, Recycled Images: The Art and Politics of Found Footage Films, as works that are "representative" of the found footage genre.

Other 16 mm films would follow, such as Mizu Shobai (Water Business) (1993), Stranger Baby (1995), and Almost the Cocktail Hour (1997). Lin replicated the visuals from videotapes for Taiwan Video Club (1999), a film following a community of Asian immigrants who recorded and exchanged videotapes of serial Taiwanese dramas.

From about 1999, Lin's practice also began to encompass the contexts of art and writing. Her film Almost the Cocktail Hour (1997) was screened as part of the MoMA's Cineprobe program in 1999. In February 2000, early films by Lin, such as Sphere:Circle:Round (1992), Through the Door (1992), and I Begin to Know You (1992), were screened at the Whitney Museum's film program, The Cool World: Film & Video in America 1950–2000, as part of the exhibition The American Century: Art & Culture 1900–2000. Later in September 2000, Stranger Baby (1995) was screened alongside works by Maya Deren, Peggy Ahwesh, and Yoko Ono at the Whitney Museum as part of their film series The Color of Ritual, the Color of Thought: Women Avant-Garde Filmmakers in America, 1930–2000.

For a commission by Cabinet Magazine, Lin developed the web art project everything is not the same (2000). Her new films from this period included No Power to Push Up the Sky (2001) and Mysterial Power (2002).

Lin was a fellow at the Whitney ISP from 2000 to 2001 under the Studio Program. Lin met the artist H. Lan Thao Lam in 2000. By 2001, they began working collaboratively as the artist team Lin + Lam, developing multi-disciplinary research-based projects concerning the construction of history and collective memory.

Lin taught at the Vermont College of Fine Arts, Montpelier, Vermont from 2006 to 2015. Since 2015, Lin has been Associate Professor of Film Theory and Digital Cinema at The New School, New York City.

In 2015, Lin created Moby Ovary or Madame Dick, a one-minute film melding together the thematic links between two modern classics, Moby-Dick (1851) and Madame Bovary (1856).

Lin authored the book Freud's Jaw and Other Lost Objects: Fractured Subjectivity in the Face of Cancer, published in 2017 by Fordham University Press. In the book, Lin conducts psychoanalytic studies of intellectuals Sigmund Freud, Audre Lorde, and Eve Kosofsky Sedgwick, critiquing binaries of life and death, as informed by Lin's personal experiences with breast cancer. In the book Pedagogies of Woundedness: Illness, Memoir, and the Ends of the Model Minority (Philadelphia: Temple University Press, 2021), James Kyung-Jin Lee writes about Freud’s Jaw and Other Lost Objects, describing Lin's approach as a methodological fulfillment of Mel Y. Chen’s call to "contemplate attachment and vulnerability to the inanimate as a radical form of queer love".

In 2018, Lin completed her feature film, The Cancer Journals Revisited, after two years of filming with H. Lan Thao Lam as the director of photography. The film was screened at venues such as BAMcinemaFest in Brooklyn, the BlackStar Film Festival, Philadelphia, and the San Diego Asian Film Festival.

== Selected works ==
=== I Begin to Know You (2 min 30 sec, 1992) ===
An early film by Lin, I Begin to Know You (1992) is a 16 mm film assembled from found footage of women working in domestic settings across international contexts. The film was screened in the touring experimental video program Downsizing the Image Factory at Unité d'habitation, Firminy, France in 1993, curated by video artist Jason Simon. In the program catalogue, Simon describes the work as drawing upon a "global image bank to offer some elusive variations on the picturing of women in the domestic arena" functioning as a "ready-made ethnography" that considered the feminine figure of the homemaker.

=== Mizu Shobai (Water Business) (12 min, 1993) ===
In Mizu Shobai (Water Business) (1993), Lin uses water to convey the cultural and linguistic qualities of the Japanese language and mythologized understandings of the geisha. The film brings together two separate stories, of a geisha lost at sea, and another about the first geisha to travel across the globe. In a review for LA Weekly, film critic Manohla Dargis writes that: “Through lush images and narrative shards, Lin builds a lyrical critique of the ways in which the figure of the Japanese woman exists in the imaginary.”

=== Stranger Baby (14 min, 1995) ===
Described as a "UFO diary film," Stranger Baby (1995) sees Lin drawing upon alien iconography to explore her experiences of growing up in the west. Including a layered soundtrack with voiceovers that form a collage of narratives and interviews, these voices articulate the complexities of race and gender relations, examining the destructive tendency towards racial profiling. Ideas of alienation emerge through spliced images of people staring blankly into the sky, a girl attempting to connect with a man caught between projection and reality, and filmic images associated with UFOs. Contending with the threats and allure of alienation, the film provokes viewers to recognize themselves as being complicit in or being recipients of a discriminatory gaze.

=== Taiwan Video Club (14 min, 1999) ===
Taking from the aesthetics of bootleg VCR tapes, Taiwan Video Club (1999) follows a community of Asian immigrants, predominantly women, who recorded and exchanged videotapes of serial Taiwanese television programs. Lin views this manipulation of mass culture as "a diaspora of Asian female spectatorship." Lin thus extends these women's aims by fabricating the name "Taiwan Video Club" for the community, with her mother identified as the original member of the Club. Featuring 'poor images' that bear the traces of mediation, alongside insertions of text, the video work invites and challenges ideas of cultural translation.

=== The Cancer Journals Revisited (98 min, 2018) ===
Lin's feature film The Cancer Journals Revisited (2018) interrogates the ways representations of cancer may isolate or erase the women it claims to help, returning to Black feminist writer Audre Lorde's memoir about her experiences with breast cancer, The Cancer Journals (1980). Lin filmed 27 diverse interviewees whose lives were impacted by cancer, all of various ages, backgrounds, and sexual identities, reading excerpts aloud from Lorde's book. Described as "poetic nonfiction", the film further layers scenes such as two acrobats supporting each other in the air, an interviewee performing a yoga routine, and close-ups of a mastectomy scar. Included are black-and-white footage of medical facilities and colleges in New York City, and residences in Staten Island, places where Lorde would have frequented while living in New York. The film also reveals Lin's own cancer diagnosis. Through captions and voiceovers, the film perhaps attempts to "mimic the unsettling and nonlinear nature of diagnosis and recovery."

== Selected publications and writings ==
- Lin, Lana (2017). Freud's Jaw and Other Lost Objects: Fractured Subjectivity in the Face of Cancer. New York: Fordham University Press. ISBN 9780823277728.
- Lin, Lana; Lam, H. Lan Thao (2021). "Living in the uncanny". In Bajec, Manca; Holert, Tom; Smith, Marquard (eds.). Pause. Fervour. Reflections on a Pandemic. Berlin: Harun Farocki Institut and Journal of Visual Culture. ISBN 978-1-5272-9544-5.
- Lin, Lana (2021). "Possibility Made Real". World Records. 5: Beyond Story.
- Jamilla Musser, Amber; Lin, Lana (January 2021). "Audre Lorde Revisited". ASAP/Journal. 6 (1): 1–15. doi:10.1353/asa.2021.0000.
- Lin, Lana (July 27, 2022). "Seams, response to Dorinne Kondo's World-making: Race, Performance, and the Work of Creativity". Syndicate.Network. Archived from the original on August 28, 2023.
- Lin, Lana. Sliwinski, Sharon (ed.). "Dream of a Keen". Museum of Dreams. Archived from the original on August 28, 2023.

== Awards ==
Lin has received awards from the Javits Foundation, Fulbright Foundation, Jerome Foundation, New York State Council on the Arts, and New York Foundation for the Arts.

She has been MacDowell Fellow in 2022, 2017, 1999 (with Sharon Hayes), and 1996, also having fellowships at Civitella Ranieri Foundation and GIDEST at The New School.

Her film The Cancer Journals Revisited (2018) won Best Feature Documentary at the San Diego Asian Film Festival 2019 and Favorite Experimental Film at the 2019 BlackStar Film Festival, Philadelphia.
