= River Trade Terminal =

Container terminal in Hong Kong

River Trade Terminal 香港內河碼頭
- Company type: Privately owned company
- Industry: Container terminal
- Founded: 1996
- Headquarters: Hong Kong
- Area served: Hong Kong
- Key people: Director and General manager: Mr. Paul Chan
- Parent: Hutchison Port Holdings; Sun Hung Kai Properties
- Website: rttc.com.hk

The River Trade Terminal (RTT) is the only container terminal in Hong Kong for river cargo. The operator is known as River Trade Terminal Company Limited. Located in Siu Lang Shui / Pillar Point, within Tuen Mun Town, Tuen Mun District, it mainly handles and consolidates container and bulk cargo from upstream prior to dispatch to Kwai Tsing Container Terminals and vice versa.

The company was established in 1996 and the terminal was completed in 1999. The terminal occupies a 65 hectares (160 acres) site in Tuen Mun with 49 berths along 3,000-metre (9,800 ft) of quay front. Its shareholders include Hutchison Whampoa and Sun Hung Kai Properties.
