= Carin Kuoni =

American curator, writer and arts administrator

- Education: M.A. at the University of Zurich, B.A. from Sorbonne
- Known for: Contemporary Art
- Movement: Modernism, Abstract art
- Awards: 2014 Andy Warhol Foundation Curatorial Fellowship
- Website: https://veralistcenter.org/about/staff/

Carin Kuoni is an American curator, writer, arts administrator, and director of The Vera List Center for Art and Politics at The New School in New York City, US. Kuoni believes that political consciousness has not fully vanished from cultural production, and that it is more subtly embedded in a broader range of publicly engaged art. Kuoni has a special focus on promoting art that re-engages the past. Kuoni is one of the founding members of REPOhistory, a group of artists that act as a medium for the development of public art projects based on a historical platform.

== Education ==
Kuoni received a B.A. and M.A. at the University of Zurich, and she also received a B.A. from the Sorbonne (Paris IV).

== Career ==
Kuoni is the Senior Director and Chief Curator of the Vera List Center for Art and Politics at The New School and assistant professor of Visual Studies at the university. Kuoni was the director of exhibitions at Independent Curators International from 1998 to 2003. From 1992 to 1997 she was the director of the Swiss Institute. Kuoni is an art critic for the newspaper Neue Zuercher Zeitung and other publications. She also edited an English-language edition of selected papers of the German artist Joseph Beuys, Energy Plan for the Western Man: Joseph Beuys in America. Kuoni is also a curator and she says that the intention of curators should be to provide inspiration to students and professionals in a field. Kuoni was also a Travel Companion for the 57th Carnegie International in 2018. In 2015, Kuoni directed SITAC XII: Arte, justamente in Mexico City.

== Work ==
=== Major exhibitions ===
Kuoni curated the exhibition that is presented in the Anna-Maria and Stephen Kellen Gallery at the Sheila C. Johnson Design Center at Parsons. This exhibition took the form of a stage set up for debate. The stage consisted of four distinct structures that each feature analytical as well as generative components. The first structure was a central platform, created by Liam Gillick. The first phase consists of lectures, performances, solution-driven workshops, and panels. The second phase of the exhibition consisted of interpretative materials that put the exhibition into context and creating little brands. There would be stickers, posters, handouts, and a gallery guide at the second part of the exhibition. The third phase of the exhibition consisted of workshops inserted into existing classes at Parsons. The workshops constituted specific challenges and force the participants to come up with immediate solutions. The fourth phase of the exhibition consisted of public lectures and panels that reiterated the subject. Kuoni believes that while the students are creating their own exhibitions they are learning more about the often overlooked past.

=== Public collections ===
Kuoni was one of the founding members of REPOhistory, and the projects that are produced from them are primarily located in public spaces. Most of their projects are projected in New York City and Atlanta, Georgia. REPOhistory used metal street signs, mass media, and maps to distribute their information.

=== Awards and nominations ===
Kuoni is the recipient of a 2014 Andy Warhol Foundation Curatorial Fellowship.

=== Publications ===
Forces of Art: Perspectives from a Changing World, editor-in-chief. Amsterdam: Valiz, 2020.

Assuming Boycott: Resistance, Agency, and Cultural Production, Laura Raicovich, Carin Kuoni, Kareem Estefan, editors. New York: OR Books, 2017.

Entry Points: The Vera List Center Field Guide on Art and Social Justice, No. 1, Carin Kuoni, Chelsea Haines, editors. New York: Vera List Center, 2015.

Speculation, Now: Essays and Artwork, Prem Krishnamurthy, Carin Kuoni, Vyjayanthi Venuturupalli Rao, editors. New York: Vera List Center/Duke University Press, 2014.

Considering Forgiveness, Matthew Buckingham, Carin Kuoni, Aleksandra Wagner, editors. New York: Vera List Center, 2009.

Words of Wisdom: A Curator's Vade Mecum, editor. New York: Independent Curators International, 2001.

Energy Plan for the Western Man: Joseph Beuys in America, editor. New York: Four Walls Eight Windows, 1993.
