= Soko Islands =

Group of islands in Hong Kong

索罟群島
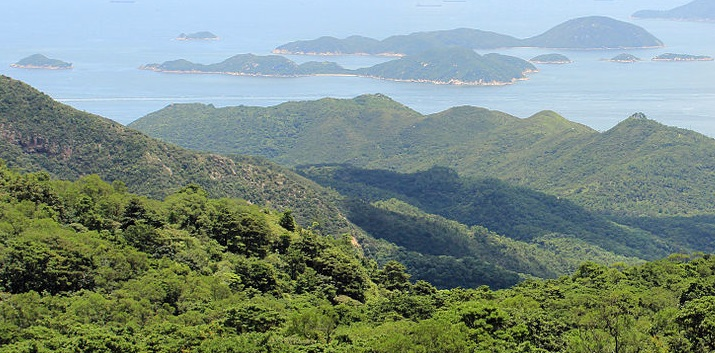
- View of the Soko Islands from Tian Tan Buddha. The hills in the foreground are part of Lantau Island.

- Location of the Soko Island within Hong Kong

Geography
- Archipelago: Soko Islands
- Total islands: 11
- Major islands: Tai A Chau, Siu A Chau

Administration
- Hong Kong
- District: Islands District

Soko Islands
- Traditional Chinese: 索罟群島
- Simplified Chinese: 索罟群岛
Transcriptions
Standard Mandarin
- Hanyu Pinyin: Suǒgǔ Qúndǎo
Yue: Cantonese
- Yale Romanization: Sok gú kwàhn dóu
- Jyutping: Sok^{3} gu^{2} kwan^{4} dou^{2}

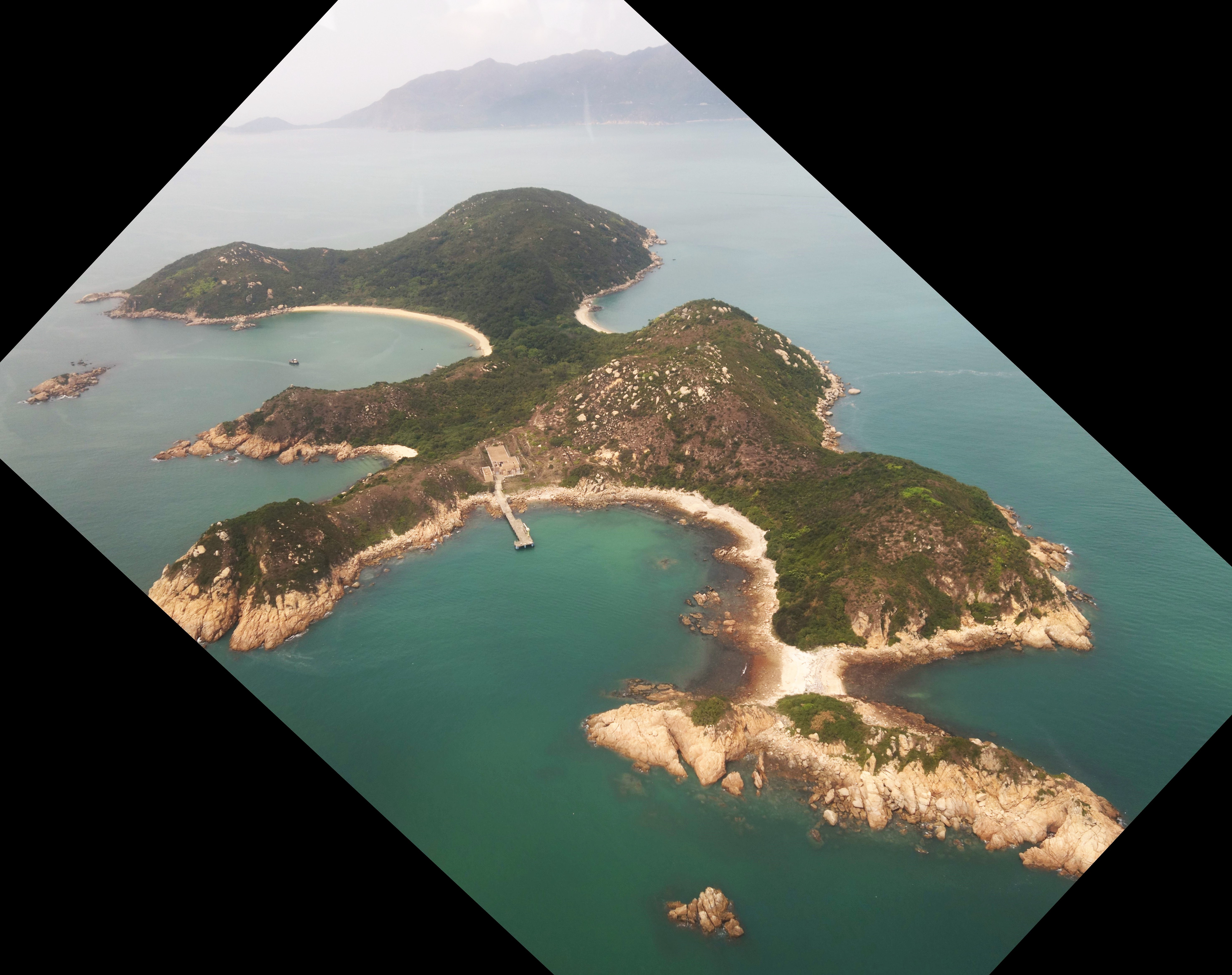
Aerial view of Siu A Chau looking towards the South coast of Lantau Island.

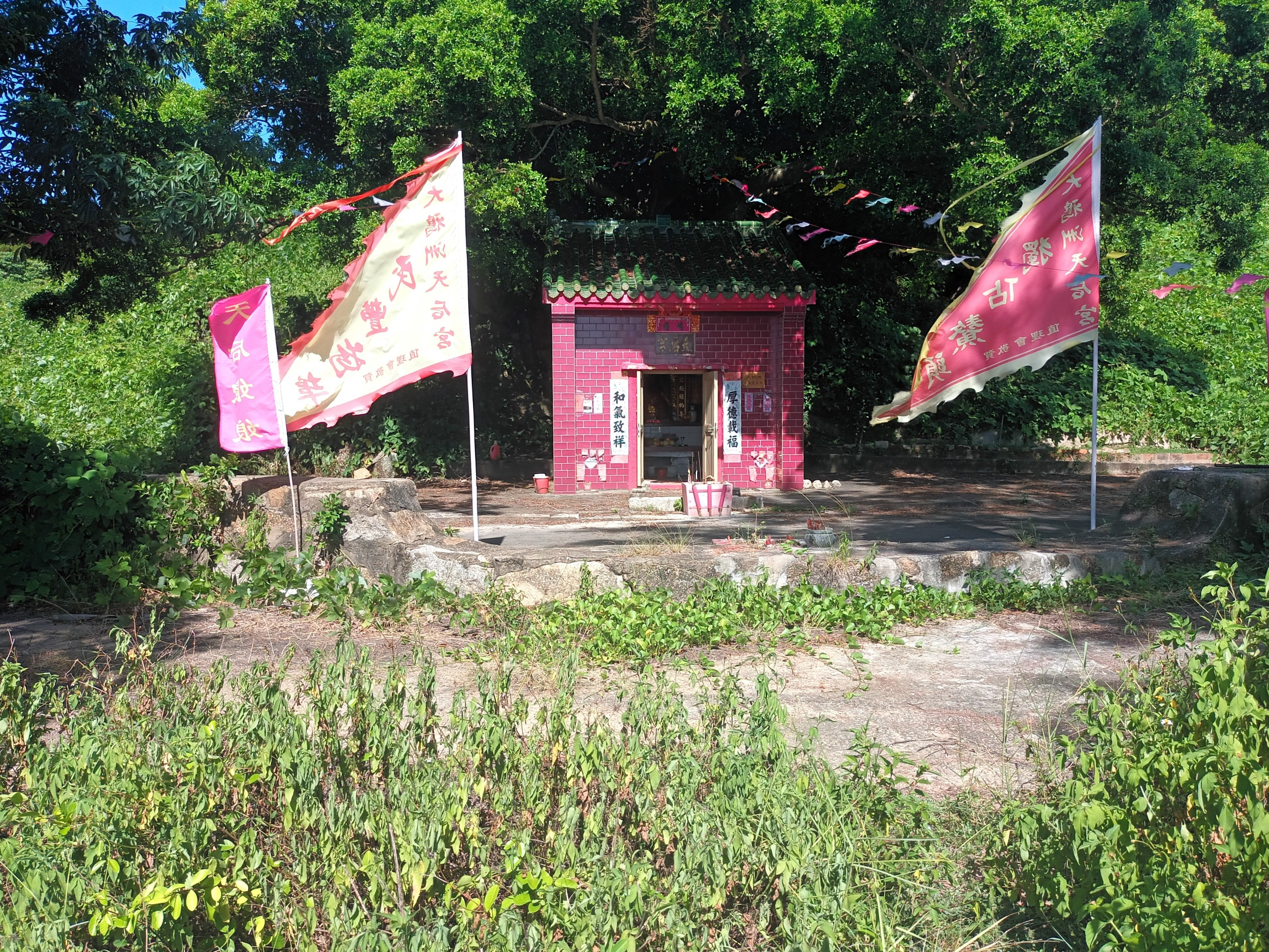
Tin Hau Temple on Tai A Chau.

The Soko Islands (Chinese: 索罟群島) are a group of islands in Hong Kong. The group consists of Tai A Chau, Siu A Chau and several smaller nearby islands, in the southwesternmost waters of the territory, to the southwest of Lantau Island.

An older name for this island group was "Sok Kwu Kwan To" (Fishing Net Islands).

The islands are mainly composed of granite and a band of rhyodacite. Waters of the island group are brackish due to being in the Pearl River estuary.

== Islands ==
The islands of the group are:

- Cheung Muk Tau (樟木頭)
- Ko Pai (高排)
- Lung Shuen Pai (龍船排)
- Ma Chau (孖洲)
- Shek Chau (石洲)
- Siu A Chau (小鴉洲)
- Tai A Chau (大鴉洲)
- Tau Lo Chau (頭顱洲)
- Wan Hau Chau (灣口洲)
- Yuen Chau (圓洲)
- Yuen Kong Chau (圓崗洲)

== History ==
=== Prehistoric ===
Stone tools dating from the Neolithic period to Bronze age (c.4500-221 BC) have been found on Tai A Chau during excavations in 1982 and 2005. These include tools such as Drills, Adzes, and Pounders.

=== Soko Island Villagers ===
Although now uninhabited, the Soko Islands used to be inhabited by fishermen and farmers as early as the 1770s. This is evidenced by the inscribed bells in the small Tin Hau temples on Tai A Chau and Siu A Chau, presented by devotees in 1828 and 1773 respectively. There is also a tomb on Siu A Chau that dates to 1803, the surname Chow (Chinese: 周) is inscribed on it.

During the late 1950s, the population of Soko Islands was around 65 people. There were three dominant families, the Ng (Chinese: 吾), Yeung (Chinese: 楊) families of Tai A Chau, and the Chow (Chinese: 周) family of Siu A Chau. All describe themselves as the direct descendants of the original settlers, who are from a Cantonese or Hakka origin. The main economic activity on the islands was fishing and farming, as well as pig breeding, rice farming, and shrimp paste manufacturing. All trade connections are almost entirely with Cheung Chau, where goods are transported by motor or sailboat. Occasionally Papayas are grown and sold.

In 1959, one classroom was built to provide education up to a level equivalent fourth grade primary school. At the time, there were 28 pupils, all from Tai A Chau. Students who wish to study further needed to travel to Cheung Chau.

During The 1960s, 350 pigs were donated by the Kadooree Experimental and Extension Farm to boost the pig raising industry in the Soko Islands. Pineapple plantations were also planted as a new export product.

In 1973, a 15,000 sq. ft. jointly owned artificial fish pond was opened to act as a new source of income for the villagers. To celebrate the opening, 400 Carp were transported and released into the pond by army helicopters.

During 1975 the population of the Soko Islands was around 200 people.

=== Tai A Chau Vietnamese Detention Centre ===
During the 1980s, a Vietnamese detention centre was being built to accommodate the waves of Vietnamese fleeing after the fall of Saigon in 1975. This also caused the original villagers to abandon the island.

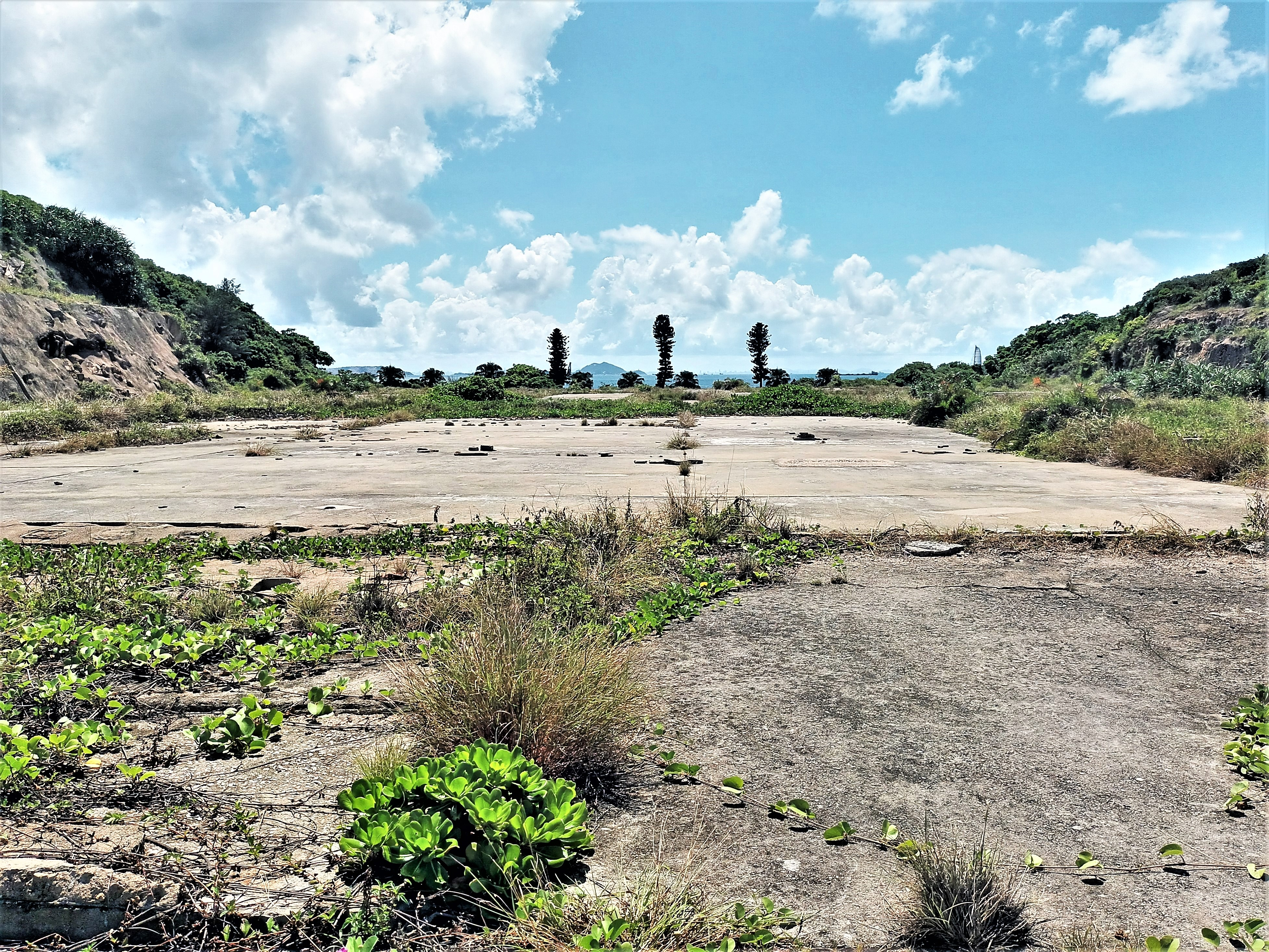
Site of Tai A Chau Detention Centre (demolished).

In 1991, the Tai A Chau Detention Centre (IN59), a refugee camp for Vietnamese boat people, started operation and accommodated thousands of refugees. It was closed in September 1996.

=== Developments after 2000 ===
In 2006, a low-level radioactive waste storage facility was built on Siu A Chau. It remains the only facility of this type in Hong Kong. The facility repurposes disused air raid tunnels to deal with Hong Kong's radioactive waste for the next 100 years, the complex comprises a 55 m-long (180 ft) jetty, a shielded waste storage vault, a fully equipped laboratory, an automatic control room, a wastewater management system and specially designed waste reception and processing areas.

In 2016, CLP Power proposed the islands as site for a terminal to receive liquefied natural gas (LNG) for use in electricity generation. This proposal is opposed by local environmental groups because the surrounding waters are an important habitat for various marine species, particularly the rare Chinese white dolphin.

In February 2020, OceansAsia reported finding 70 face masks washed up on one beach of the islands. The same beach was examined the following November, and OceansAsia volunteers reported collecting 54 more masks.

== Conservation ==
The soft shore beach of Siu A Chau can attract green turtles and the islands were proposed to be a protected marine park.

The South Lantau Marine Park (南大嶼海岸公園) was designated as a marine park in June 2022. It encompasses the Soko Islands and an area between Siu A Chau and Tai A Chau. The stated aim of the marine park is to help conserve the Chinese white dolphins and finless Porpoises.

== Education ==
The Soko Islands are in Primary One Admission (POA) School Net 97. Within the school net are three aided schools (operated independently but funded with government money) on Cheung Chau; no government schools are in this net.
