= Vera List Center for Art and Politics =

American nonprofit organization

- Established: 1992
- Location: 66 W. 12th St., room 604; Manhattan, New York, NY 10011
- Director: Carin Kuoni
- Website: www.veralistcenter.org

The Vera List Center for Art and Politics is an American nonprofit research organization and public forum for art, culture, and politics, established in 1992. Vera List was an American art collector and philanthropist.

The Vera List Center awards the Jane Lombard Prize for Art and Social Justice, which honors an artist or group of artists who has advanced social justice in visionary ways. The award was formerly known as Vera List Center Prize for Art and Politics.

== History ==
The Vera List Center for Art and Politics was established at The New School, a private research university in New York City, in 1992. It was named after Vera G. List, an American art collector and philanthropist who died in 2002. She was a life trustee of the university and provided an endowment for the center.

The Vera List Center has its origins in the annual Vera List Lecture, which began in 1986 at the New School's Human Relations Center, soon afterwards to be renamed the Vera List Center for Adult Studies. This center's mission and name were changed in 1992, when it became the Vera List Center for Art and Politics.

The first program series launched at the Vera List Center for Art and Politics was the Sustaining Democracy Series, a lecture program that examined the role of art in pushing forward controversial political issues and opening public debate, including government sponsorship of art, censorship and the roles of artists and citizens.

== Mission and work ==
Centered around the notion that art is politically valiant, the Vera List Center seeks "to foster a vibrant and diverse community of artists, scholars, and policy makers who take creative, intellectual, and political risks to bring about positive change".

Through public programs and classes, prizes and fellowships, publications and exhibitions, the Center supports art as an expression of the political moments from which they emerge, considering the intersection between art and politics the space where new forms of civic engagement must be developed.

The Vera List Center for Art and Politics is a W.A.G.E. Certified organization. W.A.G.E. Certification is a national program initiated and operated by the nonprofit Working Artists and the Greater Economy that publicly recognizes nonprofit arts organizations demonstrating a history of, and commitment to, voluntarily paying artist fees that meet the minimum payment standards.

Since 2004, Carin Kuoni has been the director and chief curator of the Center.

== Focus theme ==
The Vera List Center for Art and Politics develops their programs in cycles, habitually identifying a topic of particular urgency and broad resonance that brings together artists, scholars, activists, public intellectuals, and political and cultural leaders to discuss and explore thematic issues and questions, through a variety of programs, over the course of four semesters. The first annual theme for 2004–05 was Homeland, followed by Considering Forgiveness in 2005–06, The Public Domain in 2006–07, Agency in 2007–08, Branding Democracy in 2008–09, Speculating on Change in 2009–10, Thingness in 2011–13, Alignment in 2013–2015, and Post Democracy in 2015–17. The theme for 2018-2020 was If Art is Politics. The theme for 2020–2022 is As For Protocols.

== Public events ==
The Vera List Center organizes panel discussions, lectures, conferences, workshops, and online programs that are created in consultation with the center's advisory committee and with current and former fellows. Occasionally, the VLC produces exhibitions.

All VLC initiatives are driven by the live encounter of artists, scholars, historians and other thinkers and makers who together consider topics of broad popular relevance. From these live events spring additional programs such as those featured on the Vera List Center website, including Art & Research Projects, Publications, and others.

== Jane Lombard Prize for Art and Social Justice ==
Launched to recognize the center's 20th anniversary, the Jane Lombard Prize for Art and Social Justice (formerly the Vera List Center Prize for Art and Politics) is a biennial prize honoring an artist or group of artists who has taken great risks to advance social justice. International in scope, it is awarded for a project's long-term impact, boldness, and artistic excellence.

The prize initiative unfolds across various platforms and over an extended period of time. An exhibition of the winning project, a conference, integration into classes, and a publication featuring select nominated projects complement a cash award and short-term New York City residency for the honoree.

Beginning with the 2018-2020 biennial prize cycle, the prize was renamed the Jane Lombard Prize for Art and Social Justice after art dealer Jane Lombard gifted $5 million to the center. The prize is worth $25,000.

=== Prize winners ===
2022–2024 Prize Winner: ProppaNOW

The collective won the prize for the show OCCURRENT AFFAIR. The jury's choice voted unanimous for the artist collective. Quote from the justification for the decision: "We are honored to bestow the 2022–2024 Jane Lombard Prize for Art and Social Justice on proppaNOW, the First Nations artist collective from Brisbane, Australia. Founded in 2003 to combat the invisibility of urban Aboriginal contemporary art that addresses the issues of our time, it has broken with expectations of what is proper (‘proppa’) in Aboriginal art; created a new sovereign space for First Nations artists internationally outside colonial stereotypes, desires for authenticity, and capitalist capitulations; and opened new political imaginaries."

2020-2022 Prize Winner: Avni Sethi

The 2020-2022 Prize was won by Avni Sethi for her project, 'Conflictorium' - a museum of conflict established in Mirzapur, Ahmedabad, in India.

2018-2020 Prize Winner: Chimurenga

The 2018-2020 Jane Lombard Prize for Art and Social Justice was awarded to Chimurenga, the Pan African collective who have boldly and unapologetically reclaimed the African imaginary.

Chimurenga invests in deep research on history, representation and culture through a methodology of collective remobilization of knowledge. The artistic process is a forward reimagining of the global polity, through a multiplicity of forms, eschewing the separation of various art forms from one another and from wider social and political practices. This includes the Pan African Space Station, the roaming Chimurenga library, and the periodical Chronic, which incorporate the sonic, performative and written experiences in digital and physical spaces through which the project decenters and recreates new centers of knowledge. It reflects on the collective political histories and memories in the pan African community that is world-making.

Founded by Ntone Edjabe in 2002, Chimurenga performs as a pan-African platform that promotes voices of culture, arts and politics from Africa. As one of Chimurenga's outputs, Pan African Space Station (PASS) is an online radio station and pop-up studio, simultaneously, "a performance and exhibition space; a research platform and living archive." Developed by Chimurenga in collaboration with musician and composer Neo Muyanga in 2008, PASS is a virtual and material space that reflects on the collective political histories and memories in the Pan-African community. With its slogan "There are other worlds out there they never told you about," the interdisciplinary station intersects sound, music and words, further engages in conversations including art and technology, community and borders, utopia and oppression.

As an internet based radio station, PASS explores the possibilities of creating new knowledge across distributed networks of time and space. Through live performance, stories about music in Africa and archival exhibitions, PASS plays a significant role in challenging existing ideas about Africa and bringing unique aspects of the interconnection between music and history. At the same time, PASS also expands its projects to physical spaces such as cities of Johannesburg, Amsterdam, Helsinki and Cairo. Chimurenga uses a metaphorical term "landing" to emphasize the ways in which the virtual "space station" enters into physical spaces. Upon landing each city, Chimurenga collaborates with local cultural producers to organize conferences, festivals and exhibitions. As such PASS is a catalyst for idea-sharing and innovation of African art and culture. As noted on its website, PASS investigates "how we locate ourselves and how we mediate our human and historic commonality."

Press:

2016-2018 Prize Winner: Maria Thereza Alves

Brazilian artist Maria Thereza Alves research-based practice, literally and metaphorically holds open a space at the intersection of art and science to challenge and think expansively about the social history and possible futures that germinating seeds hold within themselves. Though her project Seeds of Change Alvs explores the social, political and cultural history of ballast flora in port cities and, in so doing, reveals patterns, temporalities and instruments of colonialism, commerce and migration going back many centuries.

Seeds of Change is a long-term project that so far has been presented in several European port cities – Marseille, Liverpool, and Bristol among them. It examines the legacies of colonialism and the global commerce of goods and people through the displacement of plants, focusing on the scientific, social and political history of ballast, the waste material used to stabilize ships in maritime trade and dumped in ports at the end of the ships' passages. Ballast contains "dormant" seeds that can remain viable in the soil for hundreds of years before germinating and growing. As Alves grows young plants from these dormant seeds – often in floating barges or gardens, developed in collaboration with local communities and scientists – she examines how we understand the identity of a place and its sociopolitical histories. As such the project questions the official accounts of culture as well as the lands it is built on and through.

Press:

2014-2016 Prize Winner: Abounaddara

Abounaddara, the anonymous film collective based in Syria, was the recipient of The New School's 2014 Vera List Center Prize for Art and Politics. Throughout the course of the 18-month collaboration, the Vera List Center and Abounaddara worked together to bring the collective's work to the United Nations where there was a panel discussion on civilian representation and freedom of speech in Syria. The final culmination of the prize initiative, titled, "Abounaddara. The Right To The Image" was a series of events consisting of a gallery exhibition, conference and various film screenings, that explored the ways in which civilians are represented in times of conflict.

Emerging from the civil uprising in 2011, Abounaddara is known for its "emergency cinema" which seeks to transcend mainstream war reporting. The collective's work highlights individuals, coming from all sides of the conflict to remind viewers both of the daily life and complexity of the civil war unfolding in Syria. Their weekly video vignettes published on their Vimeo account are intimate, jarring, and poignant. Abounaddara's driving force within their work is the belief in the "right to the image" which they define as upholding the dignity of civilians who otherwise might not have a say in how they are represented.

Press:

2012-2014 Prize Winner: Theaster Gates

Theaster Gates was the 2012-2014 prize recipient for, Dorchester Projects. Theaster Gates: A Way of Working was an 18-month collaboration between the artist and The New School that culminated into a two-day forum and gallery presentation. This exhibition examined the ways in which the artist develops synergies with his work and the complexities of working in an expanded studio practice within the institutional framework. The exhibition featured several works of the artist including drawing, sculpture, installation and video.

Theaster Gates, an American artist, activist and artistic director for the Rebuild Foundation, focuses his work on political enfranchisement, historical reclamation, and social inclusion. His Dorchester Projects started in 2006 with the transformation of two buildings into community gathering spaces on Chicago's South Side. Gates uses art, spirituality, and community engagement as a way to analyze urban renewal and social justice.

Press:

== Fellowships ==
The Vera List Center Fellowships support artists, curators, writers, and scholars whose exemplary work advances the discourse on art and politics. Drawing from the academic resources of The New School, the appointments provide the opportunity to develop a fellowship project in exchange with New School faculty and students and with the support of a graduate student assistant. In addition, the fellowship offers a financial stipend and a production budget to bring the project to the public through the Vera List Center's interdisciplinary program initiatives, ranging from events to installations and publications.

=== 2020-2022 Fellows ===
- Carolina Caycedo
- Etcétera
- Maria Hupfield
- Adelita Husni Bey
- Rasheedah Phillips

2020-2022 Fellowship Announcement

=== 2018-2020 Fellows ===
- Dean Erdmann
- Helene Kazan

2018-2020 Fellowship Announcement

=== 2015-2017 Fellows ===
- Lawrence Abu Hamdan
- Victoria Sobel and Casey Gollan of Free Cooper Union

2015-2017 Fellowship Announcement

=== 2013-15 Fellows ===
- Jill Magid
- Alexander Provan

2013-2015 Fellowship Announcement

=== Past Fellows ===
Other past fellows include Bouchra Khalili, Joshua Simon, Robert Sember, Lin + Lam, Marjetica Potrč, Andrea Geyer, Margarita Gutman, Susan Hapgood, Sharon Hayes, Danny Hoch, Wendy T. Ewald, Ashley Hunt, Kobena Mercer, Lorraine O’Grady, Olu Oguibe, Silvana Paternostro, Wendy Perron, Leslie Prosterman, Walid Raad, Edward Rothstein, Katya Sander, Elisabeth Sussman, David Thorne, and Jonathan Weinberg, Sarah Rothenberg, and Maurice Berger.

== Publications ==
As an extension of its public programming, the Vera List Center produces publications ranging from occasional papers, exhibition guides and books to interactive online artist projects. Following the center's interdisciplinary model, these publications respond to themes explored in the context of lectures, panel discussions, workshops, and other programs, and frequently incorporate new texts commissioned from event collaborators and others.

=== Assuming Boycott: Resistance, Agency, and Cultural Production ===
Assuming Boycott: Resistance, Agency, and Cultural Productionis the essential reader for today's creative leaders and cultural practitioners, and includes original contributions by artists, scholars, activists, critics, curators and writers examine four key areas: the historical precedent of South Africa; the current cultural boycott of Israel; freedom of speech and self-censorship; and long-distance activism. Far from representing withdrawal or cynicism, boycott emerges as a special condition for discourse, artmaking and political engagement. It features twelve newly commissioned essays and six contributions by Nasser Abourahme, Ariella Azoulay, Tania Bruguera, Noura Erakat, Kareem Estefan, Mariam Ghani with Haig Aivazian, Nathan Gray and Ahmet Öğüt, Chelsea Haines, Sean Jacobs, Yazan Khalili, Carin Kuoni and Laura Raicovich, Svetlana Mintcheva, Naeem Mohaiemen, Hlonipha Mokoena, John Peffer, Joshua Simon, Ann Laura Stoler, Radhika Subramaniam, Eyal Weizman and Kareem Estefan, and Frank B. Wilderson III.

Praise: Art&Education

=== Entry Points: The Vera List Center Field Guide on Art and Social Justice, No. 1 ===
Entry Points: The Vera List Center Field Guide on Art and Social Justice, No. 1 is a collaboration of artists, writers, policy makers, and scholars coming together to analyze the integral role of the arts in advocating for social justice. The book reflects on key moments in history at the global level where justice has been advanced by art. The first half of the work consists of three essays by Thomas Keenan, João Ribas, and Sharon Sliwinski, in addition to featuring twenty other artist projects that speak to the role of arts in social justice. The second half of the book features Theaster Gates's The Dorchester Projects, which was the recipient for the inaugural Vera List Prize for Art and Politics in 2013. Essayists include Horace D. Ballard Jr., Romi N. Crawford, Shannon Jackson, and Mabel O. Wilson. This section also features an interview between Gates and Vera List Center director, Carin Kuoni. Editors include Chelsea Haines and Carin Kuoni.

=== Speculation, Now ===
Speculation, Now is a collection of essays and artwork that offers radical, interdisciplinary concepts challenging our understanding of reality and how these new integrative perspectives can potentially alter reality. The book is a collaboration of images, concepts and language edited by Vyjayanthi Venuturupalli Rao, Prem Krishnamurthy and Carin Kuoni and includes an afterword by Arjun Appadurai. Artists and essayists include Arjun Appadurai, William Darity Jr., Filip De Boeck, Boris Groys, Hans Haacke, Darrick Hamilton, Laura Kurgan, Lin + Lam, Gary Lincoff, Lize Mogel, Christina Moon, Stefania Pandolfo, Satya Pemmaraju, Mary Poovey, Walid Raad, Sherene Schostak, Robert Sember, and Srdjan Jovanović Weiss.

=== Considering Forgiveness ===
Considering Forgiveness (published in 2009) examines issues of social, cultural and political relevance from a multitude of perspectives and is edited by Aleksandra Wagner with Carin Kuoni, with curatorial advice by Matthew Buckingham. It features textual and visual contributions commissioned for this publication from scholars, activists and artists, including Anne Aghion, Ayreen Anastas, Gregg Bordowitz, Omer Fast, Rene Gabri, Andrea Geyer, Mark Godfrey, Sharon Hayes, Sandi Hillal, Alessandro Petti and Eyal Weizman, Susan Hiller, Julia Kristeva, Lin + Lam, Jeffrey Olick, Brian Price, Jane Taylor, Mierle Laderman Ukeles, and Elisabeth Young-Bruehl.

=== OURS: Democracy in the Age of Branding Exhibition Guide ===
OURS: Democracy in the Age of Branding Exhibition Guide was on view at the Sheila C. Johnson Design Center at Parsons The New School for Design from October 15, 2008, to February 1, 2009. It was an interdisciplinary investigation of democracy positioned as a consumer brand that included original commissions by Alexis Baghat, Erick Beltran, Kota Ezawa, Liam Gillick, Emma Kay, Runo Lagomarsino, Aleksandra Mir, Nadine Robinson, and The Yes Men, and works by Sam Durant, Miguel Luciano, Carlos Motta, Trevor Paglen, Judi Werthein and many others.

== Advisory board members ==
- James Keith (JK) Brown, Chair
- Carlos Basualdo
- Frances Beatty
- Michelle Coffey
- Gabriella De Ferrari
- Ronald Feldman
- Andrew Francis
- Marilyn Greene
- Susan Hapgood
- Elizabeth R. Hilpman
- Norman L. Kleeblatt
- Carin Kuoni
- Thomas J. Lax
- Jane Lombard
- Lydia Matthews
- Susan Meiselas
- Megan E. Noh, Esq.
- Mendi and Keith Obadike
- Nancy Delman Portnoy
- Ingrid Schaffner
- Mary Watson

== Press ==
"The Vera List Center for Art and Politics has become a pillar of a new type of artistic practice that is coming to define the 21st century…[it] is undeniably a leader in the field of art and politics, particularly at a time when the two are increasingly inseparable and the relationship between them is rapidly changing. Like the understated but essential philanthropy of its founder, the Vera List Center for Art and Politics is asking difficult questions about the place of culture in times of crisis." - Hrag Vartanian, editor-in-chief and co-founder of Hyperallergic, in The Growing Necessity for the Vera List Center for Art and Politics, November 21, 2017
