= Evelyna Liang Yee Woo =

Hong Kong community artist

Evelyna Liang Yee Woo (Pinyin: Liang Yihu), also known as Yee Woo grandma, is a Hong Kong-based community artist who was born in Guangzhou, China in 1949, creating art that works with the needy and underprivileged communities in Hong Kong, China and Asia, respectively. Graduated from the University of British Columbia, Vancouver in the early 1970s, she founded the Art Function Group and "Garden Streams – Hong Kong Fellowship of Christian Artists" in the 1980s. Then, she began with “Art in the Camp" project which took various art activities to the Vietnamese detention camp and got the support from the United Nations High Commissioner for Refugees. After that, more initiatives appeared, such as pushing the charitable Community Art organization "Art in the Hospital" in 1994, a therapeutic arts project, which explored the relationships between health and art in our lives, also promoted the concrete connections among the healthcare staff, public services, patients and artists. Eight years later she established the "Art for All", another art project, which regarded art as a method to make our society more inclusive and harmonious. Afterwards, she also helped the schools for children of migrant workers in Beijing to carry out their art project. And after 05/12/2008, the Wenchuan earthquake in Sichuan Province, she paid more attention on the art therapy and hoped to use it better to help the people who were suffered unfortunately in this terrible disaster escape this bad shadow as soon as possible.

Moreover, as an artist, Evelyna also created many works of art and was invited to participate in some exhibitions among the Hong Kong and Asia, for instance, in 2002 the "Bandages for You: An Art Project" exhibited at the Gwangju Biennale in South Korea and Hong Kong Arts Centre. And the To copy or to steal, or is it merely artwork? (Oil on canvas, Installation) was selected into the Hong Kong Contemporary Art Biennial Awards 2009.
