= Buzz Slutzky =

Artist, writer, educator, and performer who works in Brooklyn (born 1988)

Buzz Slutzky (born 1988) is an artist, writer, educator, and performer who works in Brooklyn.

== Early life and education ==
Slutzky was born in Overland Park, Kansas in 1988 and grew up in Maplewood, New Jersey. Slutzky is a white Ashkenazi Jew and a non-binary transgender person, using they/them pronouns.

They graduated with a Bachelor in Arts from Sarah Lawrence College in 2010, and their Masters in Fine Arts at Parsons the New School for Design in 2015. They have taught courses in art practice and theory at SUNY Purchase College and CUNY College of Staten Island, and the Leslie-Lohman Museum of Art.

== Work ==
Slutzky has made work at the intersection of performance, craft, and figuration and has shown at the Leslie Lohman Museum of Art, New York, NY, Institute of Contemporary Art at the University of Pennsylvania, Philadelphia, PA, and Smithsonian American Art Museum, Washington, D.C.
