= High Island Detention Centre =

Former refugee camp in Hong Kong

Coordinates: 22.372651°N 114.335329°E

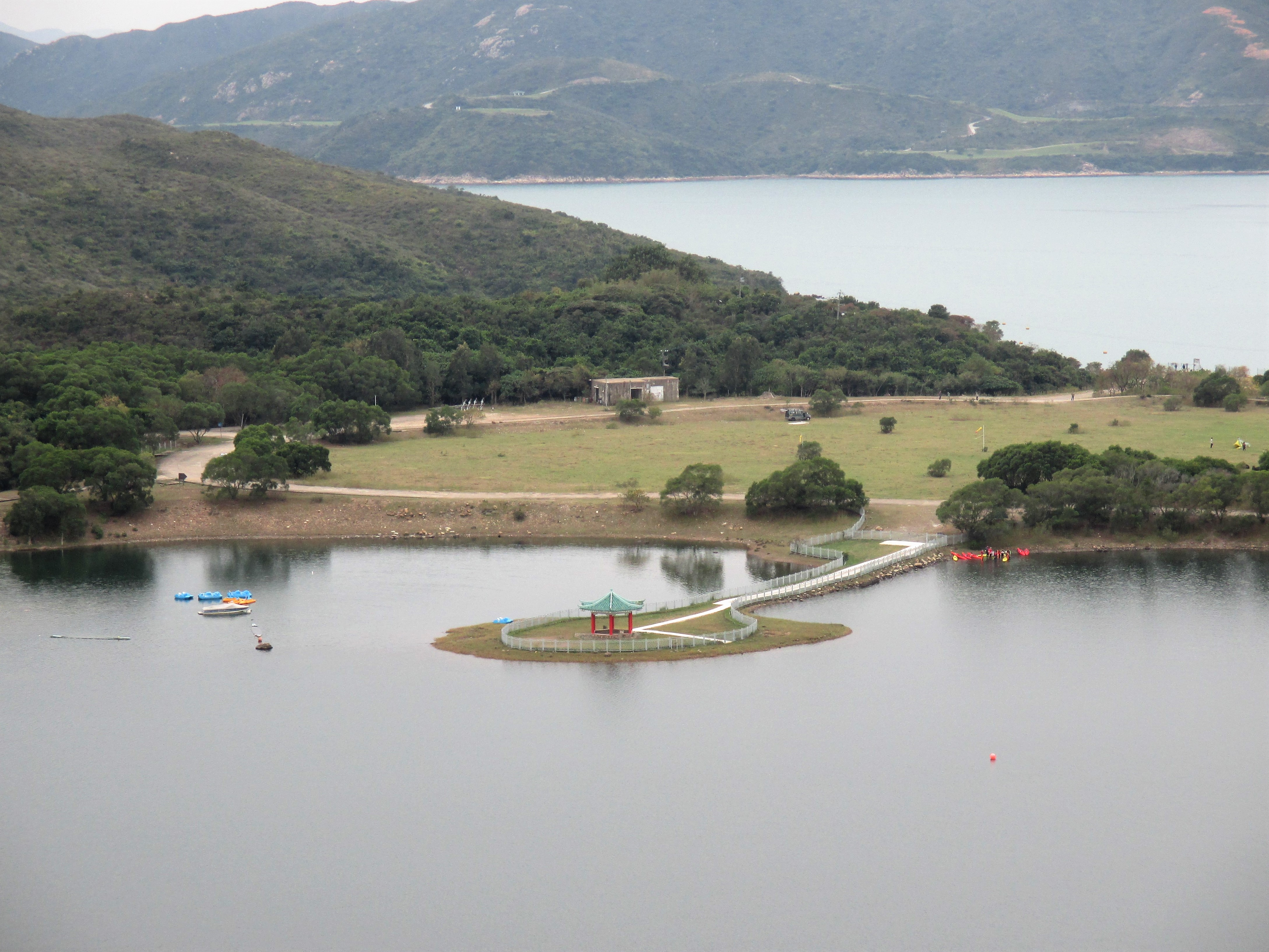
Former site of the High Island Detention Centre.

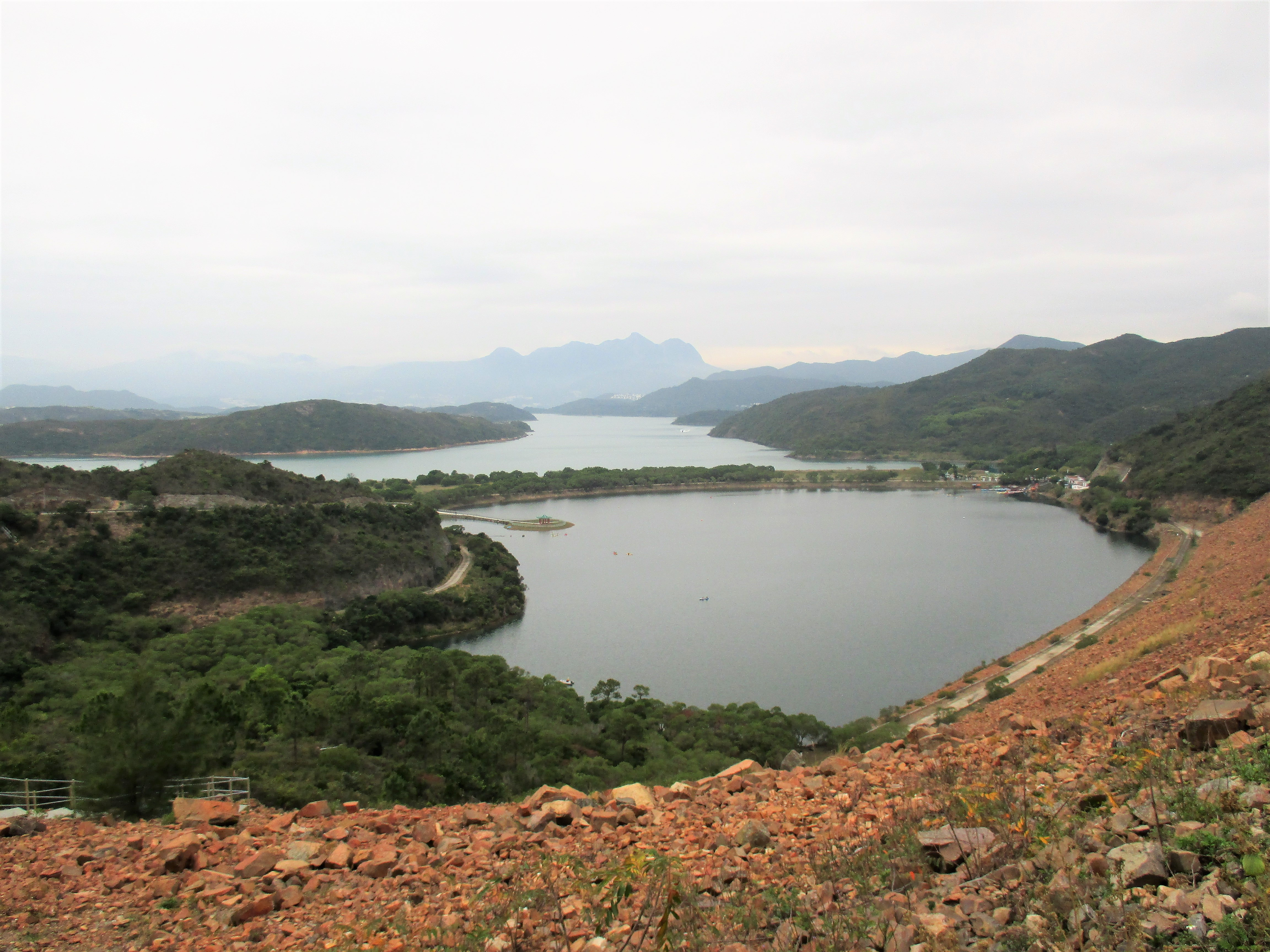
Former site of the High Island Detention Centre.

The High Island Detention Centre (Chinese: 萬宜羈留中心; pinyin: Wàn yí jīliú zhōngxīn) was a refugee camp in Hong Kong built near the West Dam of High Island Reservoir for hosting refugees and boat people from Vietnam. The area is now a flat piece of grassland that is grazed by cows. It has a pavilion that leads out of the strip of land.

The Centre was initially managed by Hong Kong Police, and then by the CSD from 1991. The construction of the Centre was delayed by two months after concerned Sai Kung residents staged a sit-in at the site. It opened in 1989 and closed in May 1998. During that period, more than 20,000 boat people passed through its doors.

== See also ==
- Vietnamese people in Hong Kong
- Vietnamese refugee detention centres in Hong Kong
