= Vietnamese refugee detention centres in Hong Kong =

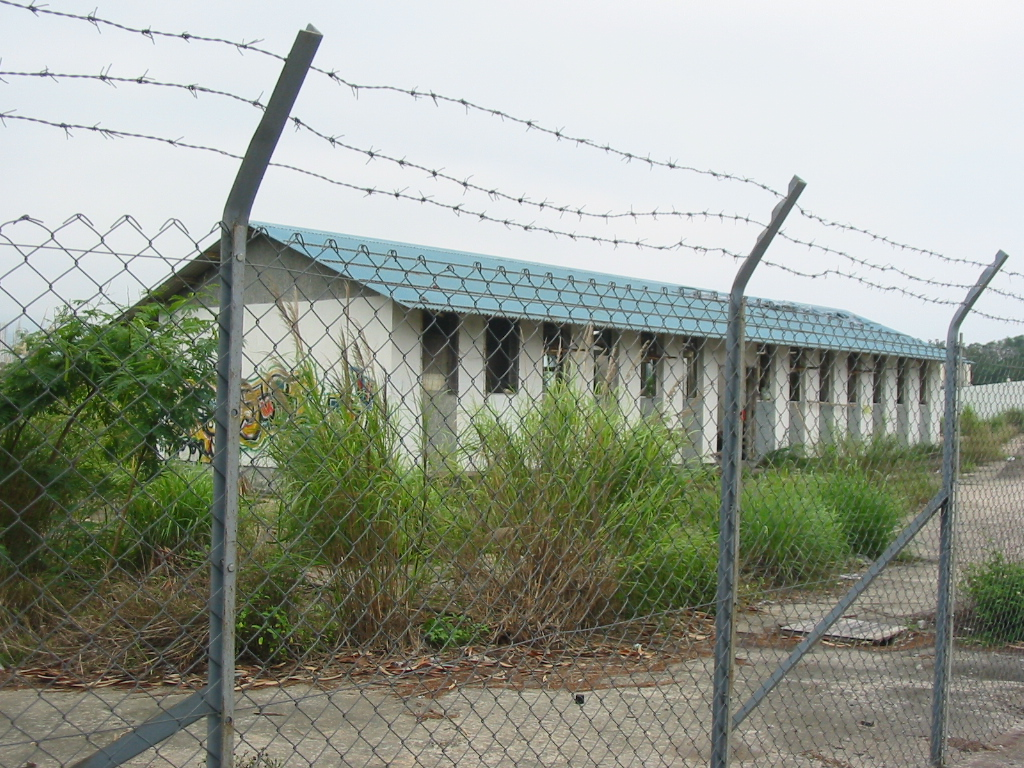
A building in Whitehead Detention Centre, one of the most famous, in 2008

Between 1978 and 2000, a number of detention centres were formed by the Correctional Services Department (CSD) in Hong Kong for the internment of Vietnamese refugees. As the government of Hong Kong took more actions against the refugees, tightened restrictions and deporting them to Vietnam, the centres were depopulated and disestablished over time.

Vietnamese Migrants Detention Centres (VMDCs) refer to some of the camps for Vietnamese migrants set up by the Hong Kong Correctional Services Department throughout the territory between the 1970s and 1990s in response to the Vietnamese migrant problem in Hong Kong. Since 1978, when the Prison Department, the predecessor of the CSD, established its first detention centre near the Kai Tak Airport in Kowloon, the department has been working with other agencies to receive Vietnamese boat people and at one time set up a Refugee Unit and recruited additional temporary staff to participate in management matters. The last detention centre near the High Island Reservoir in Sai Kung was closed in 1998, bringing an end to the CSD's Vietnamese boat service.

== History ==
The first Vietnamese refugees arrived on the same day of the fall of Saigon, and in 1979 there was another wave of Chinese exclusion in Vietnam, causing a large number of Vietnamese boat people to flee to other parts of Asia, with some 203,000 people smuggled by boat to the Pearl River Delta in the following two decades. In 1978, the Government decided to convert the former Royal Air Force Base into the Kai Tak Refugee Camp and let the Prison Department take over, and since then it has been involved in the management of Vietnamese migrants. In the same year, the Prison Department cleared the inmates of the Ma Po Ping Addiction Treatment Centre in Tong Fuk, Lantau Island, and opened an additional camp.

A record number of 70,000 refugees arrived the next year, including 2,700 who had been on the Skyluck and ran it aground, adding to the issue. As more refugees streamed in, the Hong Kong government converted prisons and barracks to refugee camps. In 1982, the Hong Kong government changed its mind and stipulated that boat people who entered Hong Kong after July 1 of that year must enter a closed camp. Those who stayed in the camp were not allowed to go out or leave the camp to work. The Education Department immediately converted some prisons into closed camps. In the same year, the Correctional Services Department established the Refugee Unit and began recruiting contractual temporary staff to assist existing correctional staff to share management tasks. These employees received a two-week intensive training course on immigration regulations, camp regulations, marching and crowd management skills, and the Vietnamese language. By the end of 1998, 1,813 temporary staff were hired. The adoption of the Comprehensive Plan of Action led to more stringent checks on migrants and more deportations back to their home countries or repatriation to other states more willing to accept refugees.

As Hong Kong was a "port of first asylum," the number of boat people in Hong Kong continued to increase in the 1980s with around 20,000 to 30,000 new arrivals every year causing the Correctional Services Department detention centres to fill up. As a result, the department has to continue to set up detention centres and even designate the industrial buildings in Tuen Mun as temporary accommodation for boat people to meet their urgent needs. In 1988, the Government abolished the closed-camp policy and replaced it with a screening policy leading to the CSD creating the post of "Assistant Commissioner (Vietnamese Shipping Services)". On the other hand, the Hong Kong Government has instead set up large detention centres at Whitehead in Ma On Shan and High Island Reservoir in Sai Kung to accommodate the large number of boat people.

In the 1990s, the Hong Kong Government began to carry out orderly repatriation operations to ensure the safe return of the boat people to Vietnam, which led to a decline in the number of boat people in Hong Kong. However, some still held onto hopes and refused to return, leading to dissent when they received repatriation notices. Subsequently, riots broke out in some camps. Among them were the incidents occurred at the Whitehead Detention Centre, where large-scale riots broke out twice, in 1994 and 1996. It was second only to the 1991 riots at Sek Kong that left 24 refugees dead. The repatriation process proceeded smoothly and the detention centres were gradually closed and restored to their original correctional use. The 'Assistant Director (Vietnamese Boat Service)' position was abolished by 1997 and in 1998, the Sai Kung High Island Detention Centre was officially closed, ending the Correctional Services Department's Vietnamese boat service.

== List ==
=== Hong Kong Island ===
| Name | District | Location | Notes | Ref. |
|---|---|---|---|---|
| Cape Collinson Correctional Institution (Refugee Section) | Eastern | Cape Collinson Road, Chai Wan | In 1979, part of the land was opened up to detain the Vietnamese. It was called the "Cape Collinson Refugee Camp" and was further converted into a confinement camp in 1983. During this period, the refugee camp was closed twice, but soon it became a refugee camp equipment and set up a refugee group. | |
| Green Island Reception Centre | Central and Western | Green Island | In 1987, a group of Vietnamese boat people from Mainland China flocked to Hong Kong. Civil Security Service immediately arranged camps for them in Qingzhou (the Sunyield Detention Center also accepted them at the same time), and then transferred them to correctional facilities. Department management. After 1998, it was used to receive and refer illegal immigrants. It was closed in 2011 and has remained vacant. | |

=== Kowloon ===
| Name | District | Location | Notes | Ref. |
|---|---|---|---|---|
| Canton Road Refugee Camp | Yau Tsim Mong District | Warehouse at Tsim Sha Tui Government Dock; Tsim Sha Tsui | The site for the resettlement of Vietnamese boat people at the beginning of the Vietnamese boat people crisis, who were subsequently sent to the Sham Shui Po Detention Centre and the Chatham Road Refugee Camp run by the Civil Aid Service. | |
| Kai Tak refugee camp | Kwun Tong | Kwun Tong Road, Kowloon Bay （now a Caritas Family Crisis Support Centre） | After the British military in Hong Kong moved from RAF Kai Tak to Shek Kong Airfield in 1978, part of the land was used as a refugee camp. Management was transferred to the Civil Aid Service in 1989 | |
| Sham Shui Po refugee camp | Sham Shui Po | Lai Chi Kok Road, Sham Shui Po （now Lai On Estate） | Used to house refugees between 1978 and 1989. | |

=== New Territories ===
| Name | District | Location | Notes | Ref. |
|---|---|---|---|---|
| Chi Ma Wan Detention Centre (Upper and Lower) | Islands | Chi Ma Wan, Lantau Island （now Correctional Services Department Staff Training Venue） | After the Skyluck incident in 1979, the Hong Kong government chose Chi Ma Wan Prison as a place of containment, and the Prison Department made room for it to be converted into a detention center. In 1982, the additional camp built on the football field to the northwest of the original Chi Ma Wan Prison was officially put into operation. In 1994, the detention center ceased operation, the upper camp was changed back to Chi Ma Wan Correctional Institution, and the lower camp became Chi Ma Wan Rehabilitation Center. | |
| Hei Ling Chau Detention Centre | Islands | Hei Ling Chau （now Hei Ling Chau Correctional Institution） | It was built in the east of Hei Ling Chau in 1982, and closed in 1994 and changed to Hei Ling Chau Correctional Institution. | |
| High Island Detention Centre | Sai Kung District | High Island Reservoir | Initially managed by the Hong Kong Police, and then by the CSD from 1991. The construction of the centre was delayed by two months after concerned Sai Kung residents staged a sit-in at the site. It opened in 1989 and closed in May 1998. During that period, more than 20,000 boat people passed through its doors. | |
| Lo Wu Detention Centre | North | Sheung Shui (now Lo Wu Correctional Institution) | Formerly the Lo Wu Military Camp, it was changed to a detention center in 1989, but closed in 1997 and changed to the first generation Lo Wu Correctional Institution. | |
| Nei Kwu Detention Centre | Islands | Hei Ling Chau (now Nei Kwu Correctional Institution) | In addition to the Hei Ling Chau Detention Center, the Correctional Services Department also converted the Li Gu Chau Detention Center into a Li Gu Detention Center. After its closure in 1997, it was planned to be converted into a drug rehabilitation center, but it was not implemented until 2002. | |
| Pillar Point Vietnamese Refugees Centre | Tuen Mun District | Pillar Point | Closed on 1 June 2000. | |
| Sun Yick Industrial Building | Tuen Mun District | Tuen Mun Industrial Area | In 1987, a group of Vietnamese boat people from mainland China flocked to Hong Kong. The Civil Security Team immediately settled them in the vacant Sun Yick Industrial Building in Tuen Mun (there was also the Green Island Detention Center to accept them at the same time), and then transferred to the Correctional Services Department. This temporary arrangement lasted around two years. On May 21, 1990, the camp was handed over to Housing Department for management, and was merged into the Hudi Detention Center in Tuen Mun on August 31 of the same year. | |
| Tai A Chau Detention Centre | Islands | Tai A Chau, Soko Islands | Tai A Chau Detention Centre was home to thousands of Vietnamese refugees from 1991 to 1996. It once held a peak population of almost 9,700 in November 1991. | |
| Tong Fuk Detention Centre | Islands | Tong Fuk, Lantau Island （now Tong Fuk Correctional Institution） | Opened in 1978, this was one of the first camps. | |
| Tuen Mun Detention Centre | Tuen Mun District | Castle Peak Road, Tuen Mun （now part of Lingnan University's campus） | Originally a closed camp, it was handed over to the Housing Department in 1990 and converted into an open camp. | |
| Whitehead Detention Centre | Sha Tin | Wu Kai Sha, Ma On Shan | After its formation in 1989, the centre became notorious for the numerous riots that occurred inside throughout its existence. Officially closed in 1997 after all remaining residents were repatriated. | |

== See also ==
- Vietnamese people in Hong Kong
- Art in the Camps (Garden Streams)
