= Tai A Chau =

Uninhabited island of Hong Kong

大鴉洲
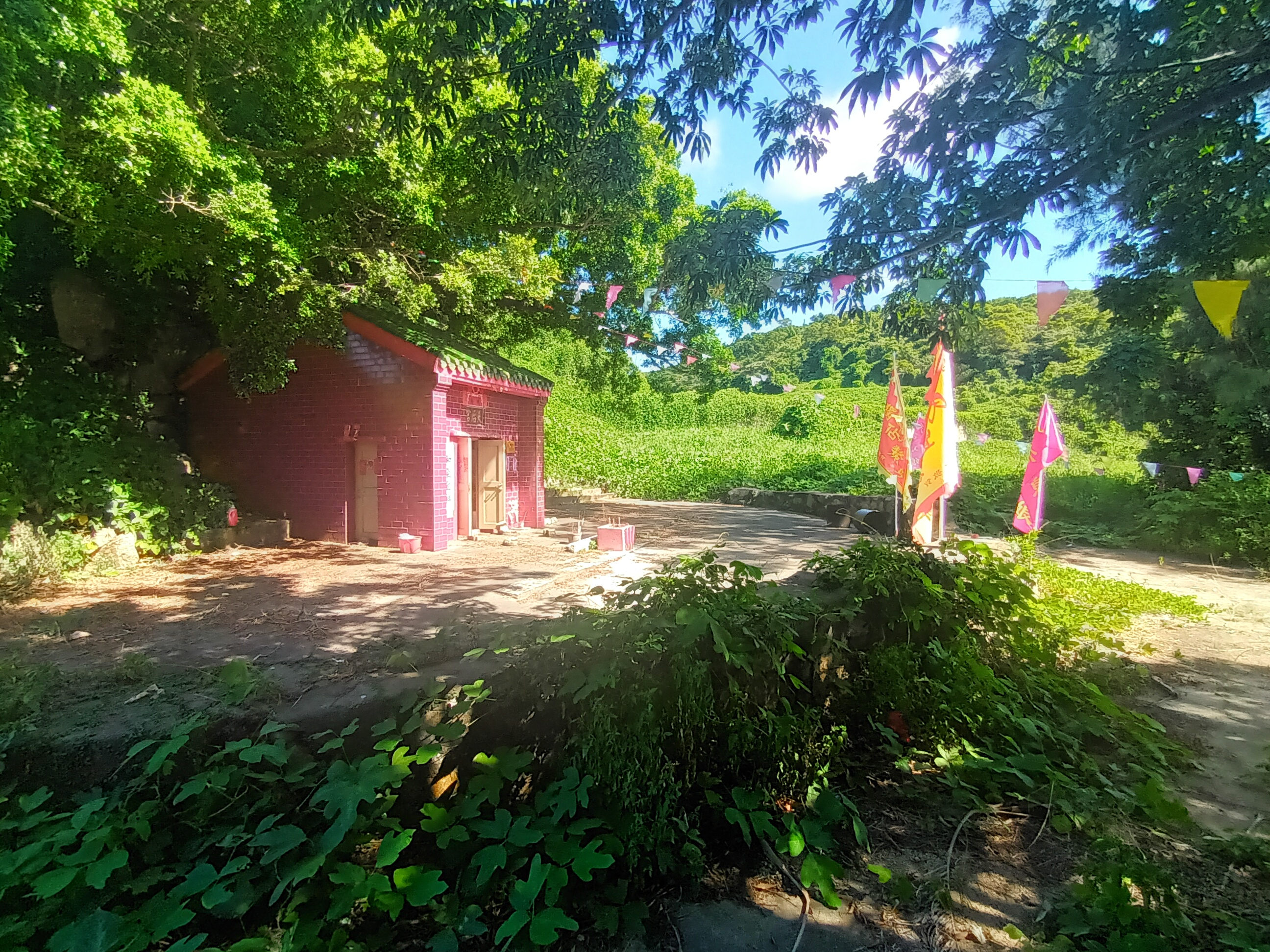
- Tin Hau Temple on Tai A Chau
- Interactive map of Tai A Chau

Geography
- Location: 4.5 km south of Lantau Island
- Coordinates: 22°9′41″N 113°54′30″E
- Area: 1.2 km^{2} (0.46 sq mi)
- Highest elevation: 154 m (505 ft)

Administration
- Hong Kong

Demographics
- Population: Uninhabited

Tai A Chau
- Traditional Chinese: 大鴉洲
- Simplified Chinese: 大鸦洲
Transcriptions
Standard Mandarin
- Hanyu Pinyin: Dàyāzhōu
Yue: Cantonese
- Yale Romanization: Daaih ā jāu
- Jyutping: Daai^{6} aa^{1} zau^{1}

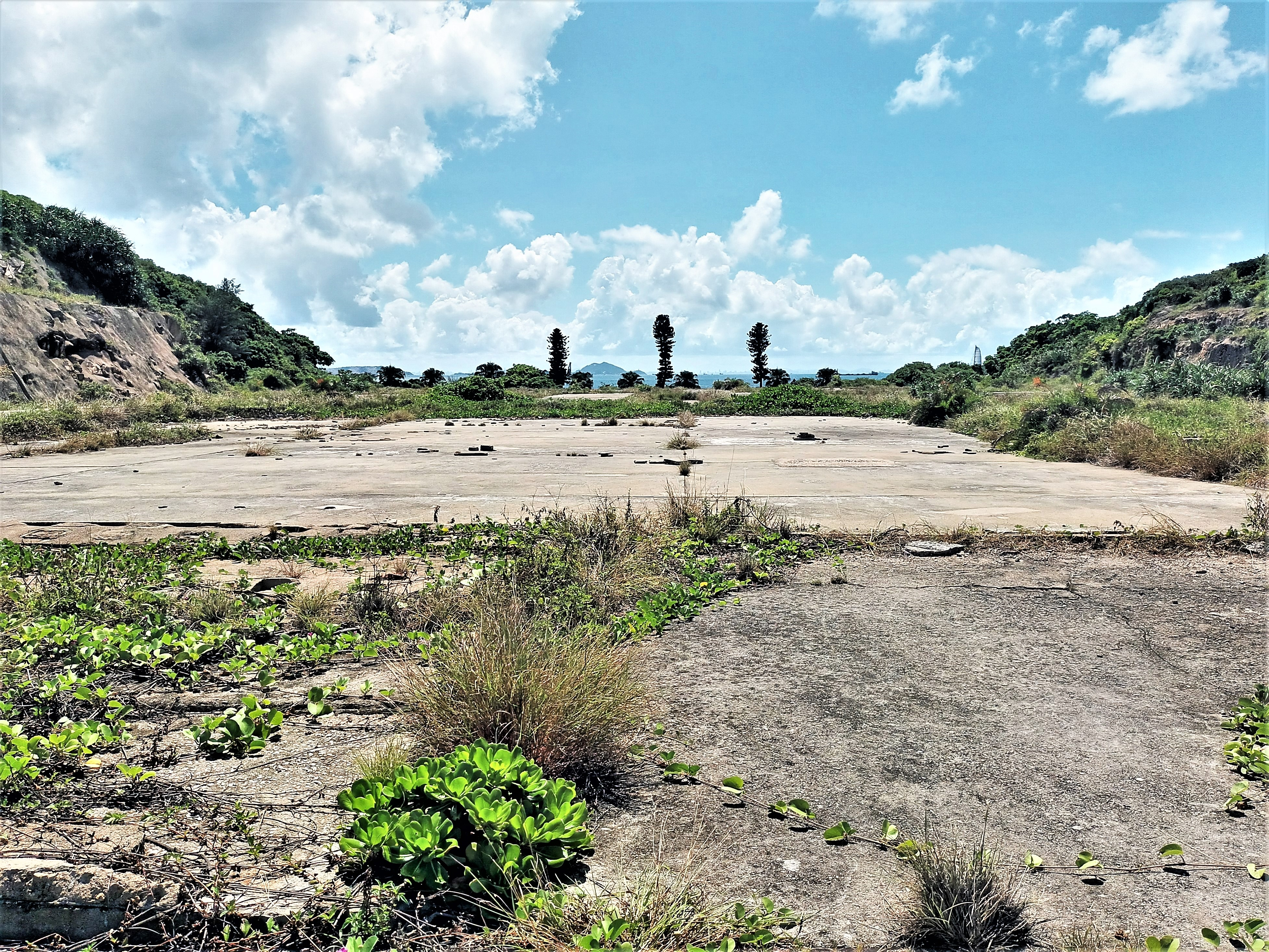
Site of former Tai A Chau Detention Centre.

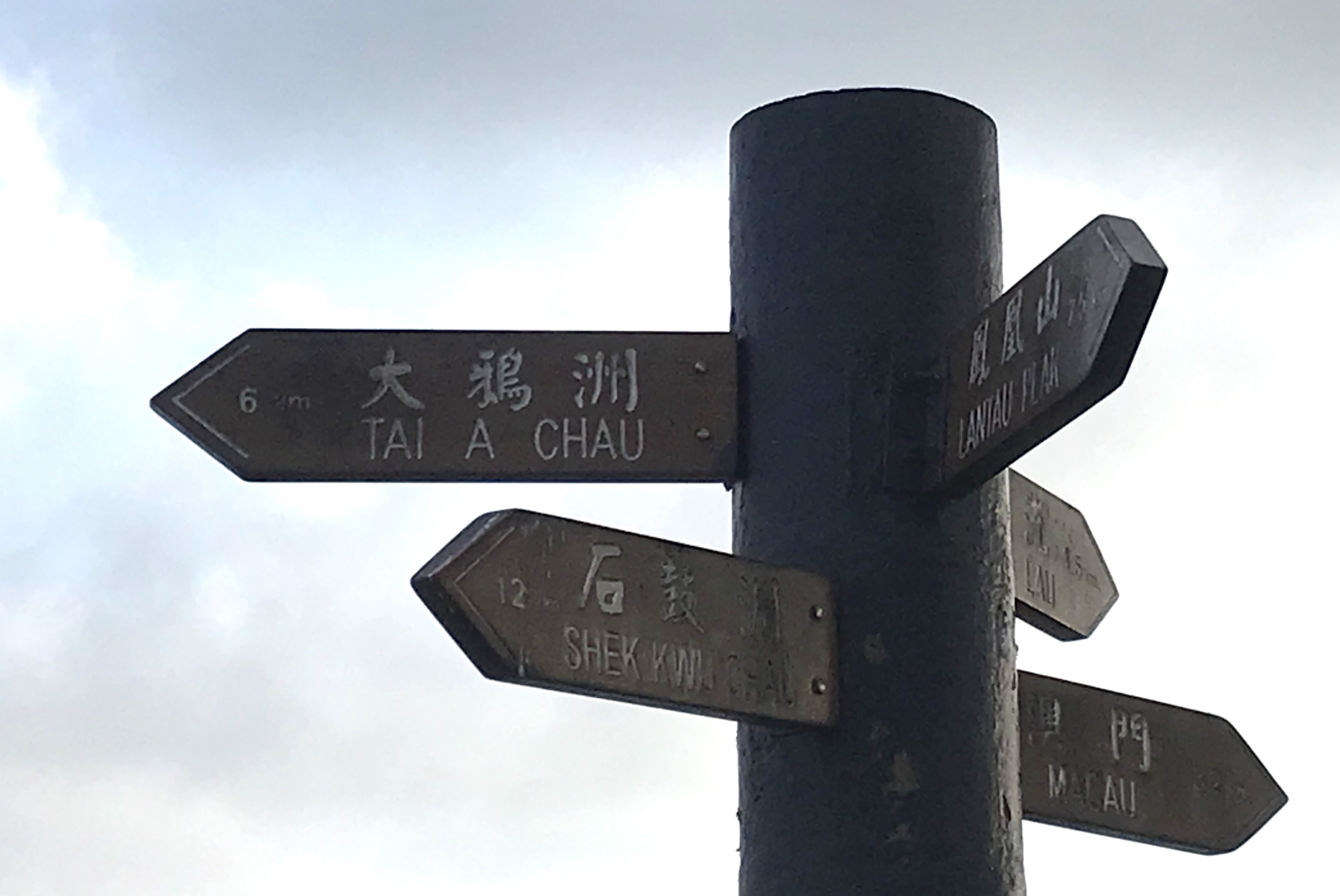
Sign pointing to Tai A Chau from Lantau Island

Tai A Chau is an uninhabited island of Hong Kong, part of the Soko Islands group, located south of Lantau Island. It is referred to as South Soko Island in some media articles.

== Geography ==
With an area of 1.2km², Tai A Chau is the largest of the Soko Islands. It is located 4.5km to the south of Lantau Island and about 2km north of the boundary of the Hong Kong territorial waters. The island has small hills with heights ranging from 85m to 154m. Its coastline is mainly steeply sloped and rocky in nature.

== Administration ==
Tai A Chau is a recognized village under the New Territories Small House Policy.

== History ==
There were historically two villages on the island: Ha Tsuen and Sheung Tsuen on the west and south sides of the island. In 1937, Walter Schofield, then a Cadet Officer in the Hong Kong Civil Service, wrote "There is a shrimp paste factory here which exports to Europe and America". The villagers left in the 1980s, when a detention camp for Vietnamese refugees was built.

Tai A Chau Detention Centre was home to thousands of Vietnamese refugees from 1991 to 1996. It once held a peak population of almost 9,700 in November 1991. After the announcement of the closure of Tai A Chau refugee facility on 10 June 1996, the transfer of the remaining Vietnamese refugees took place on 10 consecutive days from 16 to 25 September 1996. Each day, one ferry loaded with luggage, and two ferries loaded with a total of about 550 Vietnamese refugees departed Tai A Chau for HMS Tamar naval base at Stonecutters Island. They were then moved to the notorious Whitehead Detention Centre in Wu Kai Sha, before immigrating to the US under their "Resettlement Opportunity for Vietnamese Returnees Scheme". This ensured the centre was closed just prior to the handover in 1997 and all the building structures were demolished.

In February 2023 the Hong Kong Police Force carried out a crowd control training exercise on the island, leaving hundreds of spent tear gas grenades and debris from other crowd control weapons on the protected South Lantau Marine Park site.

== Features ==
The island has a temple dedicated to Tin Hau and seven earth shrines.

Two helicopter landing pads and a small jetty remain from the island's former detention centre.
