= Pillar Point (Hong Kong) =

Coastal area of Tuen Mun Town, New Territories, Hong Kong

Coordinates: 22.366036°N 113.939355°E

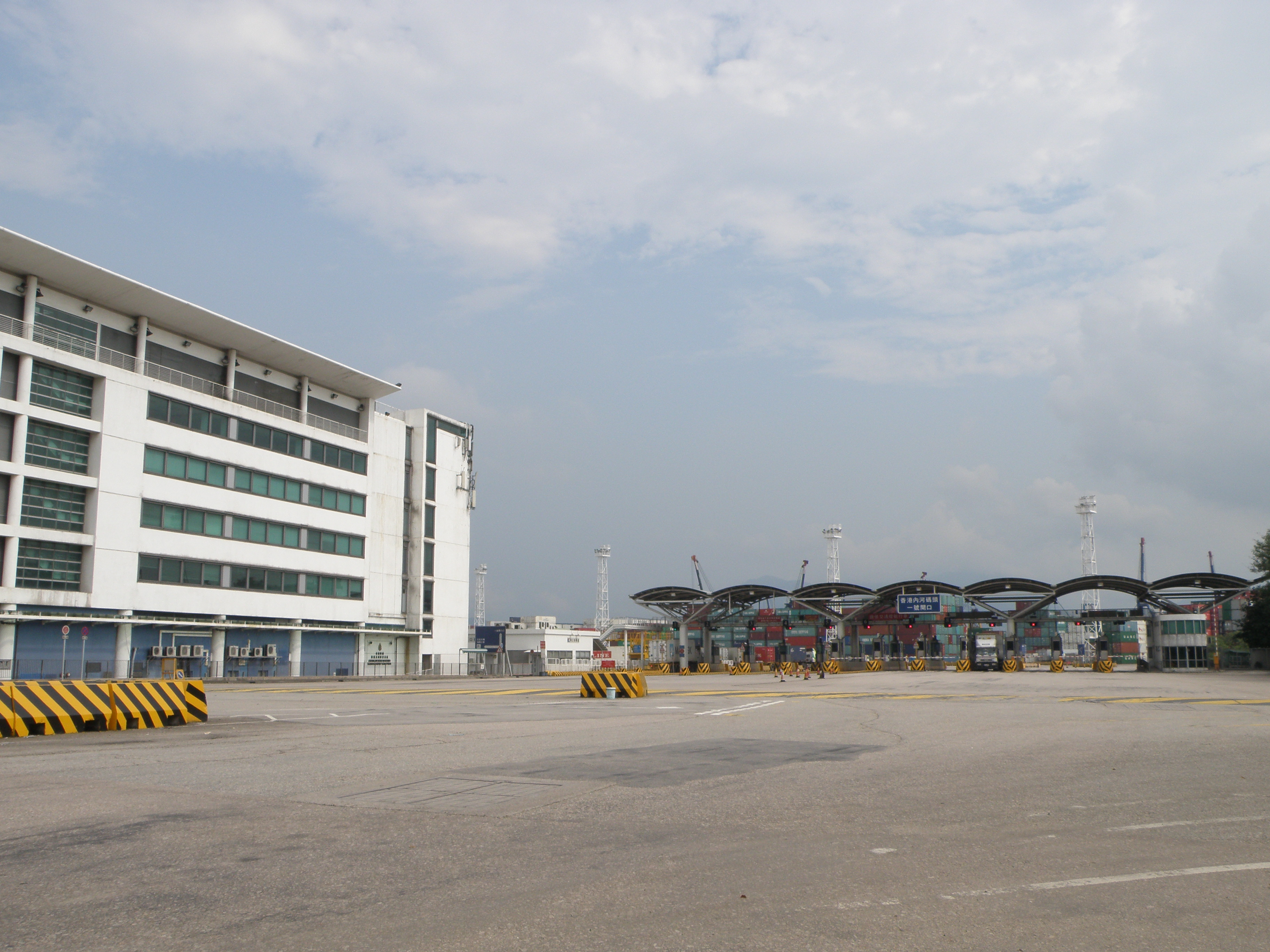
River Trade Terminal at Pillar Point, Hong Kong.

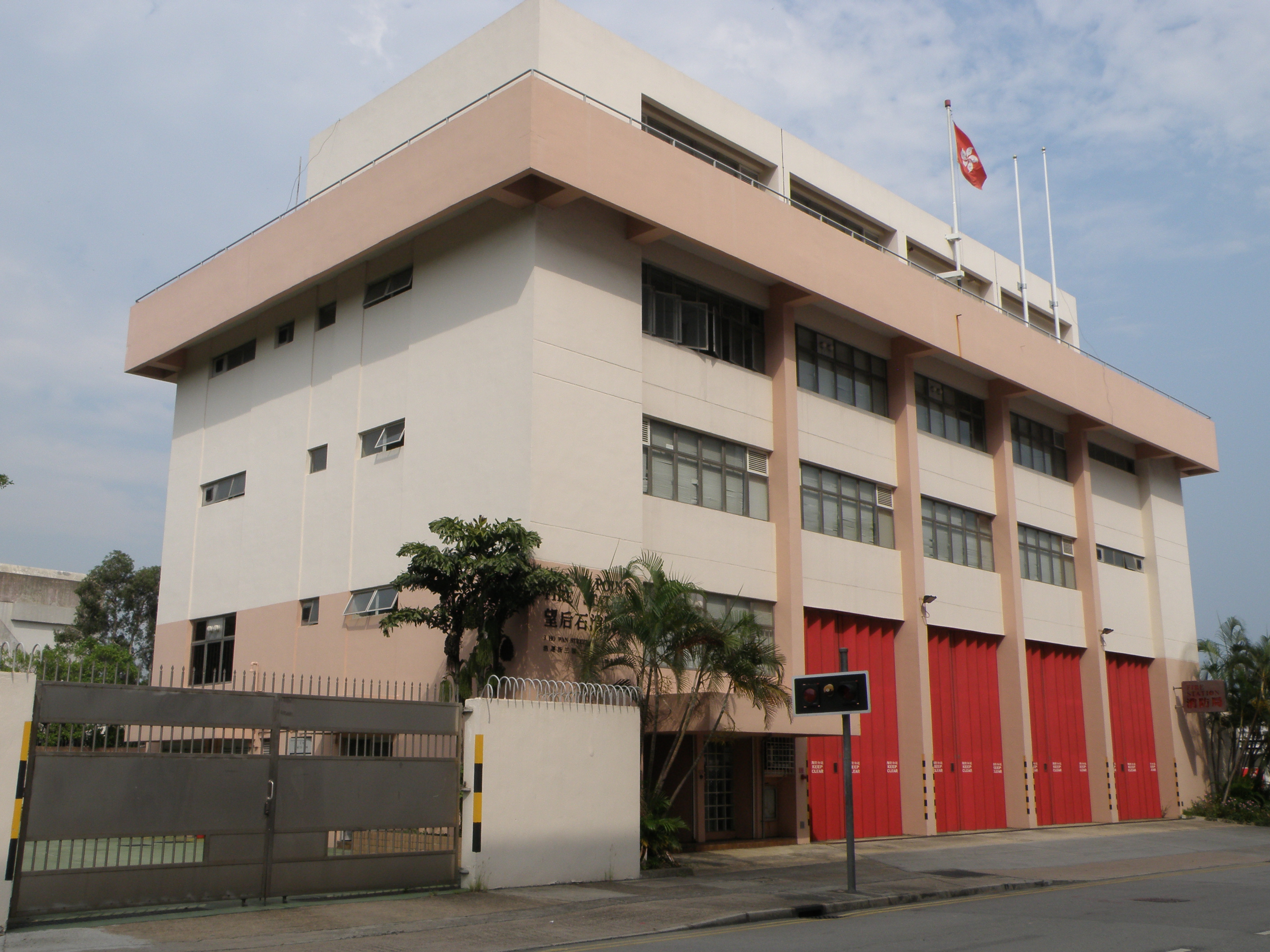
Pillar Point Fire Station

Pillar Point, also known in Chinese as Mong Hau Shek (Chinese: 望后石; lit. 'Peeking Rock for queen'), is a coastal area of Tuen Mun Town (Tuen Mun), Tuen Mun District, in the New Territories, Hong Kong.

Pillar Point is located west of the Butterfly Bay (蝴蝶灣), south of the hill Castle Peak, east of Tap Shek Kok (踏石角) and north of Urmston Road.

== History ==
Pillar Point was the site of the Pillar Point Vietnamese Refugees Centre (PPVRC), the last Vietnamese refugee camp in activity in Hong Kong. It closed on 31 May 2000.

== See also ==
- River Trade Terminal
