= Chung Wai-ming =

Hong Kong broadcaster

Chung Wai-ming 鍾偉明
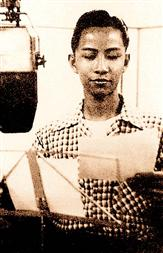
- Chung broadcasting in 1960s.

Background information
- Born: 17 July 1931; Hong Kong
- Died: 27 November 2009 (aged 78); Kwong Wah Hospital, Yau Ma Tei, Kowloon, Hong Kong
- Occupation: Broadcaster
- Years active: 1947–2009

Chung Wai-ming (Chinese: 鍾偉明; Cantonese Yale: jūng wáih mìhng), MBE (17 July 1931 – 27 November 2009) was a Hong Kong broadcaster. He was dubbed by his fellows as 'Big Brother Chung' and earned the title 'the King of Broadcasting' by his performance.

Chung started his career as a broadcaster in 1947. Throughout his career, he had worked for Rediffusion Television, the United States Information Service (USIS) and Radio Television Hong Kong (RTHK). In 1992, Chung became the first ethnic Chinese broadcaster to be appointed as an MBE; in 1998, he was presented The Life Time Achievement in Broadcasting Award by the RTHK.

== Family ==
Chung Chi-ming, one of his younger brothers, is also a broadcaster in Hong Kong.

== Biography ==
Chung left school at the age of 11. He first worked for the Nanyang Brothers Tobacco Company; he then started learning to be a film director at San Yuet Pictures in Hong Kong. In 1947, he participated in the production of a radio drama for the first time in the Radio Hong Kong's The Resurrected Rose. In 1952, he joined Rediffusion and became a programme director; he was mainly responsible for film production. At the same time, he was also an amateur participant for the recording of radio dramas. Later, he decided to focus on radio drama because his heavy workload made him unable to participate in both film production and radio drama. He participated in the production of various radio dramas of different genres and earned the title of 'the King of Broadcasting'.

Chung wanted to resign from Rediffusion and join the USIS, but Rediffusion objected to that. Finally, after discussions between the USIS and Rediffusion, the USIS allowed him to work for Rediffusion, the Radio Hong Kong (as RTHK was then known) and Commercial Radio Hong Kong outside work time. In 1970, Chung joined the Hong Kong Civil Service as a programme officer at Radio Hong Kong.

In the late 1980s, Hong Kong saw the huge influx of Vietnamese refugees. The Hong Kong Government implemented the policy of 'Comprehensive Plan of Action' on 16 June 1988 and the RTHK started to broadcast the famous 'Bắt đầu từ nay' announcement. Chung was the broadcaster reading out the Cantonese part of the announcement.

Chung retired in 1991. Yet, he continued to be a programme host in the RTHK. He became the first ethnic Chinese broadcaster to be awarded the MBE medal in 1992; in 1998, he was awarded The Life Time Achievement in Broadcasting Award by the RTHK for his contribution to broadcasting.

In the morning of 27 November 2009, Chung fainted in Prince Edward station of the Hong Kong MTR. He was rushed to Kwong Wah Hospital and was certified dead in the same morning at 11:36. Before his death, he was a host for the RTHK's programmes targeted at elderly audience.
