= Bat lau dung laai =

Hong Kong Cantonese phrase derived from Vietnamese

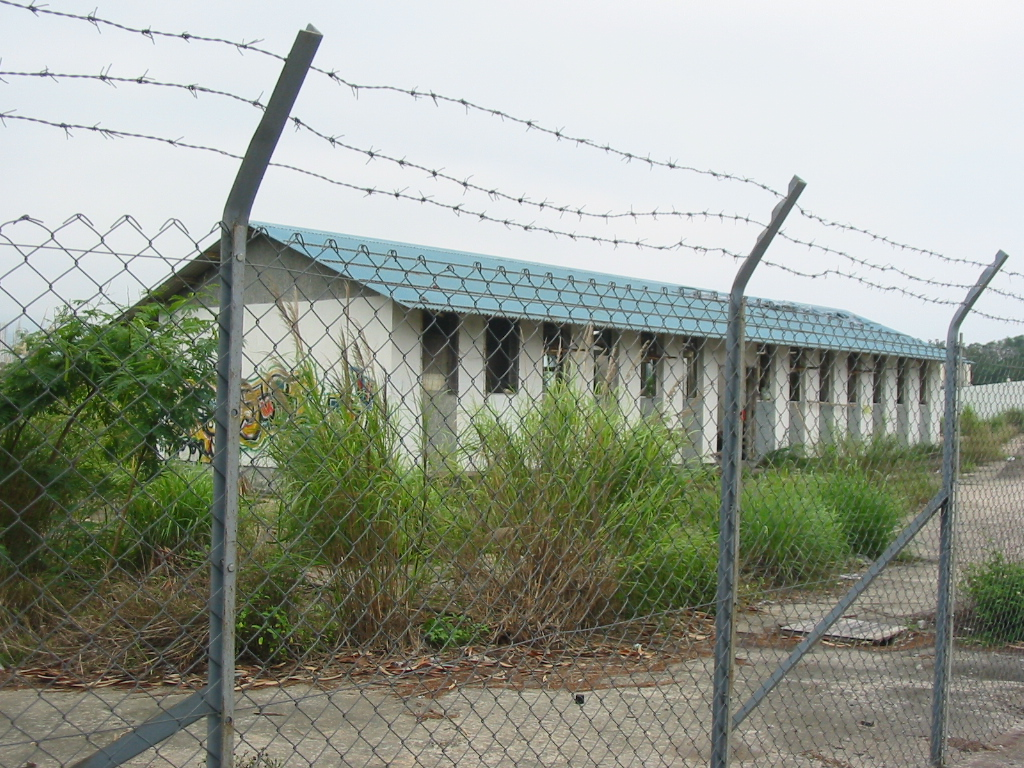
Whitehead Refugee Camp, HK disused in 2008

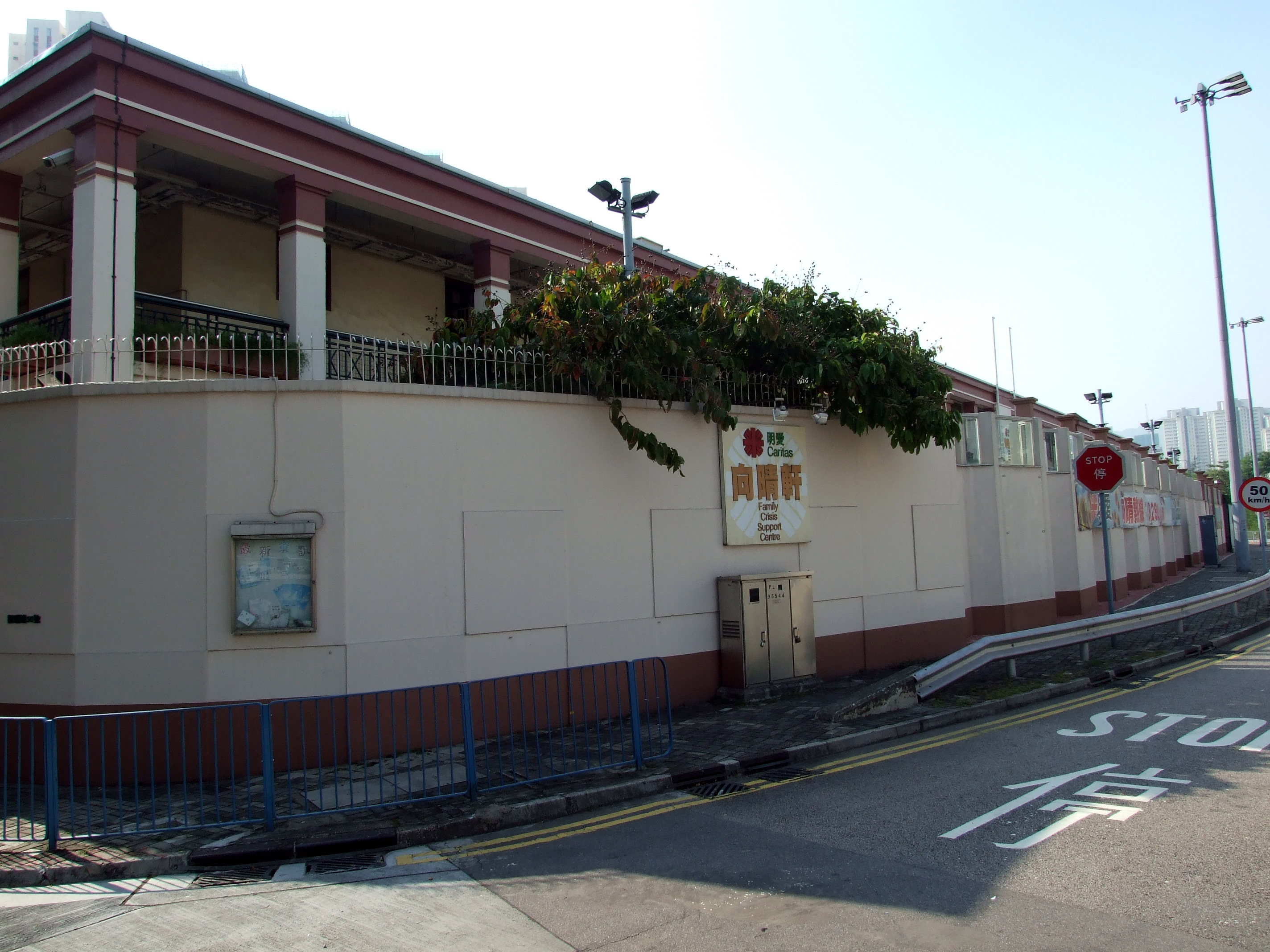
The old RAF headquarters on Kwun Tong Road, Kai Tak, which housed boat people until 1997

Bat lau dung laai (Chinese: 不漏洞拉 or 北漏洞拉; Jyutping: bat1 lau6 dung6 laai1) is a Hong Kong Cantonese corruption of the Vietnamese phrase bắt đầu từ nay, meaning "from now on" (bắt đầu = begin, start; từ = "from", nay = "now", Vietnamese pronunciation: [ʔɓat̚˧˦ ʔɗəw˨ tɨ˨˩ naj˧˧]).

The phrase was made famous in the 1980s and 1990s in Hong Kong, due to a Vietnamese-language radio public service announcement that was broadcast, nearly hourly, on public radio broadcaster RTHK.

== Background of the radio announcement ==
The broadcast was first made on 16 August 1988, which announced the government's decision to implement a screening policy that would separate refugees from non-refugees (or boat people with economic motivations). The statement was read by Chung Wai-ming, a well-known RTHK radio personality. The Vietnamese portion of the broadcast was read by a Vietnamese boat person who was about to be repatriated.

== Content of the announcement ==
=== Original text of the announcement ===
The radio announcement began with a sentence in Cantonese, the most commonly spoken Chinese variant in Hong Kong.

香港[政府]對越南船民已經實施甄別政策。跟住嗰段越南話廣播，就係向佢哋講述呢個政策嘅內容。
Hoeng1 gong2 [zing3 fu2] deoi3 jyut6 naam4 syun4 man4 ji5 ging1 sat6 si1 jan1 bit6 zing3 caak3. Gan1 zyu6 go2 dyun6 jyut6 naam4 waa6-2 gwong2 bo3, zau6 hai6 hoeng3 keoi5 dei6 gong2 seot6 ni1 go3 zing3 caak3 ge3 noi6 jung4.

This was then followed by a paragraph in Vietnamese.

Bắt đầu từ nay, một chính sách mới về thuyền nhân Việt Nam đã được chấp hành tại Hồng Kông. Từ nay về sau, những thuyền nhân Việt Nam kiếm cách nhập cảnh Hồng Kông với thân phận những người di tản vì vấn đề kinh tế sẽ bị coi là những người nhập cảnh phi pháp. Là những người nhập cảnh phi pháp, họ sẽ không có chút khả năng nào để được đi định cư tại nước thứ ba, và họ sẽ bị giam cầm để chờ ngày giải về Việt Nam.

After that, the announcement ended with another sentence in Cantonese.

剛才嗰段越南話廣播，係向企圖進入香港嘅越南船民，講述香港對佢哋實施嘅甄別政策㗎。
Gong1 coi4 go2 dyun6 jyut6 naam4 waa6-2 gwong2 bo3, hai6 hoeng3 kei5 tou4 zeon3 jap6 hoeng1 gong2 ge3 jyut6 naam4 syun4 man4, gong2 seot6 hoeng1 gong2 deoi3 keoi5 dei6 sat6 si1 ge3 jan1 bit6 zing3 caak3 gaa4.

=== Meaning of the announcement in English ===
The first sentence in Cantonese Chinese:

[The] Hong Kong [Government] has implemented the policy of 'Comprehensive Plan of Action' on Vietnamese boat people. The following Vietnamese-language announcement will explain the details of the policy to them.

The message in Vietnamese:

From now on, a new policy regarding Vietnamese boat people has been implemented in Hong Kong. Hereafter, those Vietnamese boat people seeking to immigrate into Hong Kong as immigrants due to economic reasons will be considered illegal immigrants. As illegal immigrants, they will not have the ability to settle in a third country, and they will be detained until repatriated to Vietnam.

The final sentence in Cantonese Chinese:

The Vietnamese-language broadcast just now elucidated the policy of 'Comprehensive Plan of Action' that the Hong Kong Government implements on the Vietnamese boat people who intend to enter Hong Kong.

== Use of the phrase in Hong Kong ==
Due to the frequency of the broadcast, many Hong Kong people came to learn the phrase. Some, however, mistook the phrase as a term of greeting, similar to sawasdee in Thai. The phrase eventually became a metaphor for Vietnamese people and even Vietnamese culture.

The term is now considered to be a derogatory slur for Vietnamese people.

== Portrayal in Hong Kong media ==
=== Early portrayal ===
The first recorded instance of the usage of "Bắt đầu từ nay" in Hong Kong entertainment programmes was during the 1980s, when it was used in a segment of the light entertainment show Enjoy Yourself Tonight. In the segment, a fight in the refugee camp was parodied, and two actors, using the stage names "Bắt đầu" and "Từ nay", roughed up one of the audience (played by an actor) in the "Legislative Council" meeting who was well known for creating commotions during Legislative Council meetings.

=== 1990s ===
During the 1990s, some asylum seekers managed to use self-made tools to cut through the fence around the refugee camps and escaped. This incident was replayed on RTHK's news parody programme Headliner. In the video, the phrase was split into the following

- Bắt đầu? (不漏?) (phonetically close to "bat lau", which means "leakless?", a reference to the supposedly high security measures in the refugee camp)
- từ! (洞!) (phonetically close to "dung", which means "hole!", a reference to the holes that were cut and used as escape routes).
- nay! (拉!) (phonetically close to "laai", which means "arrested!", a reference to the eventual arrest of the escapees).

=== 2000s ===
In the 2000s, Vietnamese cuisine became popular in Hong Kong, and the phrase, which had faded out of memory after the resolution of the refugee problem, resurfaced in an advertising campaign for a Vietnamese restaurant.

=== 2010s ===
The phrase was used at least twice during the 2010s on books.

- 2010 travel book on Vietnam used the phrase in its title.
- A Hong Kong émigrée to Canada used the phrase in her 2017 book on Vietnamese boat people, titled bắt đầu từ nay: The Boat People Saga.

== See also ==
- Comprehensive Plan of Action
- Vietnamese people in Hong Kong
