= Skyluck =

Panamanian-registered freighter

History
- Owner: Skyluck Steamship Co. (Kowloon)
- Port of registry: Panama
- Ordered: Union Steam Ship Company
- Builder: Henry Robb Ltd., Scotland
- Laid down: 1951
- Identification: 1179930

General characteristics
- Type: Freighter
- Tonnage: 3,500 tons
- Length: 105 m
- Beam: 15.3 m

The Skyluck was a 3,500-ton Panamanian-registered freighter that carried 3,200 Chinese and Vietnamese boat people fleeing Vietnam four years after the fall of Saigon. The ship left Vietnam from the Mekong delta city of Bến Tre, on 24 January 1979, and after a sea voyage entered Hong Kong harbour under the cover of darkness on 8 February 1979. It was discovered and ordered to set anchor by the Hong Kong Police. Thus, began a 4 1/2-month-long stalemate as the refugees waited on the ship for the Hong Kong government to decide their fate. The event turned into an international humanitarian incident, which was a symbol of a much larger problem: the estimated one million refugees who risked everything to flee Laos, Cambodia, and Vietnam in the aftermath of the Vietnam War.

== The "Boat People" ==
The end of the Vietnam War was marked by the fall of Saigon in April 1975, and over the next year, North and South Vietnam were merged to form the Socialist Republic of Vietnam. This started a period of extreme uncertainty for many South Vietnamese, Hoa, and those with ties to the former South Vietnamese government and military. The following years saw economic hardship, food shortages, and repression of the country's ethnic Chinese who formed an important part of the urban business class. Between 200,000 and 300,000 people were sent to "re-education camps" where they endured hard labour, torture, and disease. Under the New Economic Zones program, between 750,000 and 1,000,000 people were forced to relocate to northern, uninhabited forested areas, expected to clear jungle for agriculture, and their properties in the south confiscated, and redistributed by Communist authorities. It was in this environment of hardship and repression that approximately two million South Vietnamese fled the country between 1975 and the mid-1990s. The majority left in the late 1970s, with an estimated 800,000 fleeing by boat. Known as the "boat people", they endured dehydration, starvation, pirate attacks, and dangerous sea conditions. It is estimated that one-third of those who attempted the sea journey, or between 200,000 and 400,000, perished. The journey of the Skyluck occurred during the intensive late-1970s migration period of this 20-year refugee crisis. Of the estimated 800,000 boat people, approximately 230,000 (including 2,600 from the Skyluck), sought asylum in the former British colony of Hong Kong.

== Journey to Hong Kong ==
The Skyluck left Singapore on 12 January 1979, under the command of a Taiwanese captain and a mixed crew of Taiwanese, Indonesian, and Chinese seamen. Sometime between 19 and 21 January, the ship entered Vietnamese territorial waters off the Mekong Delta and loading of migrants began. From the coastal city of Bến Tre, refugees boarded small vessels and were shuttled to larger wooden vessels offshore or in rural coastal areas, and then out to the Skyluck. By the time the boarding was finished, there were 3,200 migrants on the freighter. The price of passage for each refugee was between 10 and 15 taels of gold (one tael = 1.2 troy ounces), with the cost of gold at the start of 1979 being around US$230. On 24 January, the ship departed Vietnamese waters; on the evening of 31 January it arrived off Palawan, Philippines, and overnight approximately 600 refugees were offloaded to shore. The operation was discovered by Philippine naval authorities, who drove the Skyluck out of Philippine waters.

There are multiple accounts from passengers that, on 1 February, another large vessel came alongside the Skyluck, and the collected gold payment of the passengers was transferred under armed guard. Only 10 days earlier, Hong Kong authorities had found and confiscated close to 4,000 troy ounces of gold payment (then worth US$1 million) aboard the refugee smuggling ship Huey Fong after it anchored in Hong Kong harbour with 3,300 refugees aboard.

In the early hours of 7 February, the Skyluck arrived in Hong Kong waters unannounced, with 2,651 remaining refugees aboard. The Hong Kong Marine Police did not detect the ship as it entered the territorial waters, until it anchored in the middle of Victoria Harbour. The ship was surrounded by police launches and boarded in the morning hours. Authorities escorted the ship and ordered it to anchor in the West Lamma Channel, between Lamma and Cheung Chau Islands. The engine's fuel pumps were removed to immobilize the ship.

When questioned by police, the Taiwanese captain claimed that on his way from Singapore, in the course of legitimate shipping activity, he and the crew had rescued the refugees in the South China Sea sometime between 18 and 21 January.

Refugees were confined to the ship for more than four months in squalid conditions, with the Hong Kong government providing basic necessities such as food, water, and limited access to mail. On 11 March, a group of about 100 refugees jumped overboard and started to swim the mile to shore. About fifty made it to Lamma Island, where they were promptly rounded up by police. Two were admitted to hospital and treated for exhaustion. While in custody, a group of young men unfurled a banner which read in English "Please Help Us", and tossed a message to the press through the wire fencing, which asked that the refugees be allowed to land. Those who did not make it to shore were picked up by launches and returned to the freighter. Those reaching shore were also returned to the ship.

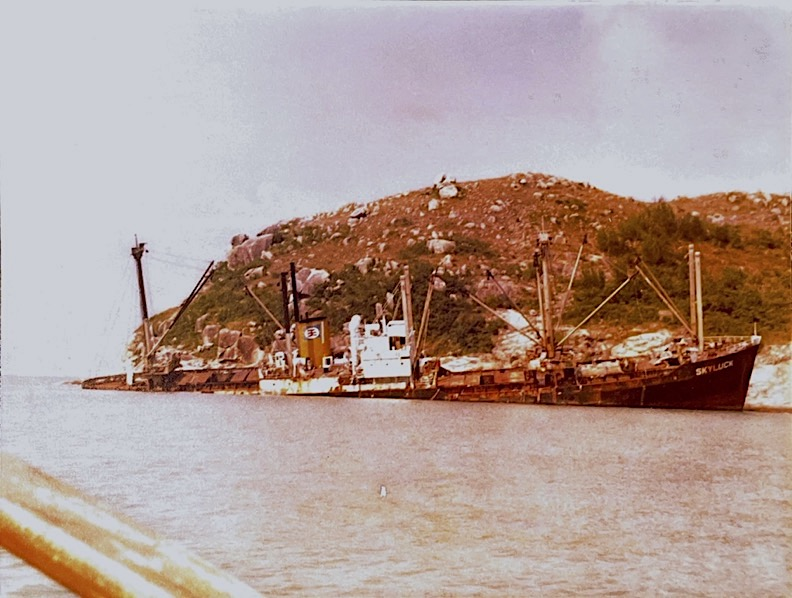
The freighter Skyluck aground on Lamma Island.

A hunger strike was commenced on 12 June, in order to force authorities to allow the refugees to come ashore. When this failed, and a storm and favourable wind direction arrived on 29 June, the anchor chain was cut, and the ship drifted aground on Lamma Island. The port side was damaged and water poured in, leaving the ship partially sunk at the shore. Refugees immediately climbed to shore on cargo nets and rope ladders thrown off the side of the ship. Some exited on the "sea side" to a pontoon that had been lashed to the ship to allow food and water delivery. However, the rope ladder was too short and passengers had to jump the remaining 3.5 metres.

All of the Skyluck refugees were transported to Chi Ma Wan detention centre on Lantau Island. Within a few weeks, refugees were moved to UNHCR refugee camps, such as the Jubilee Transit Centre in Sham Shui Po. Many ended up immigrating to the United States, Australia, Canada, United Kingdom or Germany, but had lengthy waits before being accepted.

== Criminal proceedings ==
The captain and six crew members were arrested when the Skyluck ran aground on Lamma Island, and charged with conspiracy to defraud the Hong Kong government by making false representation regarding the circumstances of the passengers aboard the ship. One of the charged, the radio operator, received immunity when he turned Crown witness, and another committed suicide prior to the trial. The remaining four, and the captain, were called "evil" by the Judge of the Tsun Wan District Court. However, the five were acquitted on the basis that they only intended to bring the refugees to the Philippines, and there was evidence they sailed the ship to Hong Kong under duress.

An investigation into the Skyluck Steamship Company officers resulted in the arrest of three company officers, including the chairman. There is no known information about results of those arrests, or whereabouts of the gold paid by the Skyluck refugees.

When the anchor chain was cut, police attempted to board the ship, and some refugees threw metal, bottles, and gasoline bombs to prevent the authorities from regaining control of the ship. Subsequently, ten refugees were charged for their role in causing what authorities deemed a "riot". Six men were acquitted, while four were convicted and received sentences of one to 2½ years. Two of the men later had their sentences reduced by 6 months on appeal.

== See also ==
- Vietnamese people in Hong Kong
