= Comprehensive Plan of Action =

The Comprehensive Plan of Action (CPA) is a program adopted in June 1989 at a conference in Geneva held by the Steering Committee of the International Conference on Indo-Chinese Refugees of the United Nations. It was designed to deter and to stop the continuing influx of Indochinese boat people and to cope with an increasing reluctance by third countries to maintain resettlement opportunities for every Vietnamese or Laotian exile, with the threat of countries of first asylum in Southeast Asia to push back asylum seekers.

By changing UNHCR policy toward the boat people, those who arrived at the camps after the so-called "cut-off dates" would no longer automatically be considered as prima facie refugees, but only asylum seekers and would have to be screened to qualify for refugee status (screening procedure or procedure to determine refugee status). The cut-off dates are:

Hong Kong
June 16, 1988
Malaysia
March 14, 1989
Thailand
March 14, 1989
Philippines
March 14, 1989
Indonesia
March 17, 1989

Those who were screened-out would be sent back to Vietnam and Laos, under an orderly and monitored repatriation program. Under the Plan, the UNHCR provided humanitarian assistance to the asylum seekers and countries of first asylum. Extensive monitoring procedures were also established in the countries of origin, and financial assistance was provided to the returnees and to the communities which agreed to accept them back.

When the steering committee first met, in 1989, hundreds of thousands of people were escaping out of Vietnam and Laos by land and boat. Faced with the continuing exodus, and increasing reluctance by third countries to maintain resettlement opportunities for every exile, countries of first asylum in South-East Asia threatened push-backs of the asylum seekers. The Conference on Indo-Chinese Refugees wanted Vietnam and the Lao People's Democratic Republic to be involved in the solution for this problem, as well as first-asylum countries, (Indonesia, Malaysia, The Philippines, Hong Kong, Thailand) and resettlement countries, to share responsibility for the asylum seekers and guarantee asylum to all refugees. The Conference also demanded that every asylum seeker would receive refuge in first-asylum countries and not be pushed back, when the process of determination of his or her refugee claim was pending. Screening procedures (or procedure to determine refugee status) were adopted to examine every individual's claim to refugee status. Recognized refugees were to receive resettlement opportunities. Rejected asylum seekers were to return to their home countries, whose governments agreed to refrain from any discrimination, harassment, persecution or unfair treatment.

After 7 years, the plan was declared ended on March 6, 1996. At that time, all the refugee camps for Indochinese boat people in South East Asia, such as Galang Refugee Camp in Indonesia, were effectively closed.

== See also ==
- Boat people
- Bắt đầu từ nay
- Vietnamese people in Hong Kong
