= Vietnamese people in Hong Kong =

Ethnic community

Vietnamese people in Hong Kong 在港越南人
Regions with significant populations
- Hong Kong

Religion
- Vietnamese folk religion, Buddhism, Christianity

Many of the Vietnamese people in Hong Kong immigrated as a result of the Vietnam War and persecution since the mid-1970s.

Backed by a humanitarian policy of the Hong Kong Government, and under the auspices of the United Nations, some Vietnamese were permitted to settle in Hong Kong.

The illegal entry of Vietnamese refugees was a problem which the Government of Hong Kong faced for 25 years. The problem was only resolved in 2000. Between 1975 and 1999, 143,700 Vietnamese refugees were resettled in other countries and more than 67,000 Vietnamese migrants were repatriated.

The Vietnamese community in Hong Kong today falls into two major categories: those who came as refugees and ended up staying and integrating into the local community, and those who have arrived in Hong Kong via a third country due to either their work or personal circumstances. This second group, although small, is a growing community. Many of the Vietnamese living in Hong Kong have Chinese ancestry, making integration easier.

== Vietnam War and refugee migration ==
=== 1970s ===
After the Vietnam War ended in April 1975 with the Fall of Saigon, North Vietnam reunited the northern and southern halves of the country, many people began to flee out of fear of the new communist government. Many refugees headed by boat to nearby countries, initially Singapore, Malaysia, Thailand, Indonesia, and Hong Kong.

Hong Kong received its first wave of Vietnamese refugees on 4 May 1975. A 3,743-strong refugee group was found arriving on board the Danish freighter Clara Mærsk and were accepted as refugees. Although the Hong Kong Government declared them "illegal immigrants", this arrival marked the start of a wave of refugee migrations to Hong Kong. Initially, Western governments shirked responsibility for resettling any refugees. In 1976, the Hong Kong Government applied to the United Nations High Commission for Refugees (UNHCR) for material aid and faster processing of resettlement requests. One year later, this first group of refugees, who had been under the responsibility of the Civil Aid Service, were entirely resettled in the United States, France, Germany, Australia, and Hong Kong.

In 1979, in response to China's attempted invasion of Vietnam, the Vietnamese Government began repressing ethnic Chinese in Vietnam causing many to seek refugee status in Hong Kong. Hong Kong declared itself the "port of first asylum". Soon, the Thai government stopped accepting refugees. Singapore and Malaysia did not allow the refugees to land, effectively turning the refugees away. Hong Kong, with the status of "safe haven", soon became the leading destination. The BBC World Service spurred the choice by making known Hong Kong's 3-month grace period in which to make resettlement applications to a third country. Hong Kong was also known for its liberal policy of allowing landed refugees the right to work. It was the peak year of arrivals, when more than 68,700 people arrived in Hong Kong.

=== 1980s ===
To deter the influx of refugees, new arrivals from Vietnam were interned in "closed camps" from July 1982 as possibilities for resettlement to third countries dwindled. These camps were criticised for keeping freedom-seeking people "behind barbed wire".

The United States started imposing stricter entry requirements on refugees in 1982 in a bid to slow the numbers accepted. The refugees were predominantly economic from the mid-1980s and onwards. Most refugees from Vietnam from about 1984 were part of the "orderly departure scheme" sanctioned by the Vietnamese government.

By 1987, many other Western countries had lowered their quotas for Vietnamese refugees whilst the influx into Hong Kong continued to increase, peaking at some 300 a day in 1989, fed by rumours that Vietnamese migrants could gain amnesty simply by landing on Hong Kong soil. The government adopted a Comprehensive Plan of Action on 16 June 1988, separating political refugees (classified as refugees) from economic migrants (classified as "boat people"). Economic migrants were considered illegal immigrants; they were denied the right to be transferred to a third country and were all sent back to Vietnam.

=== 1990s ===
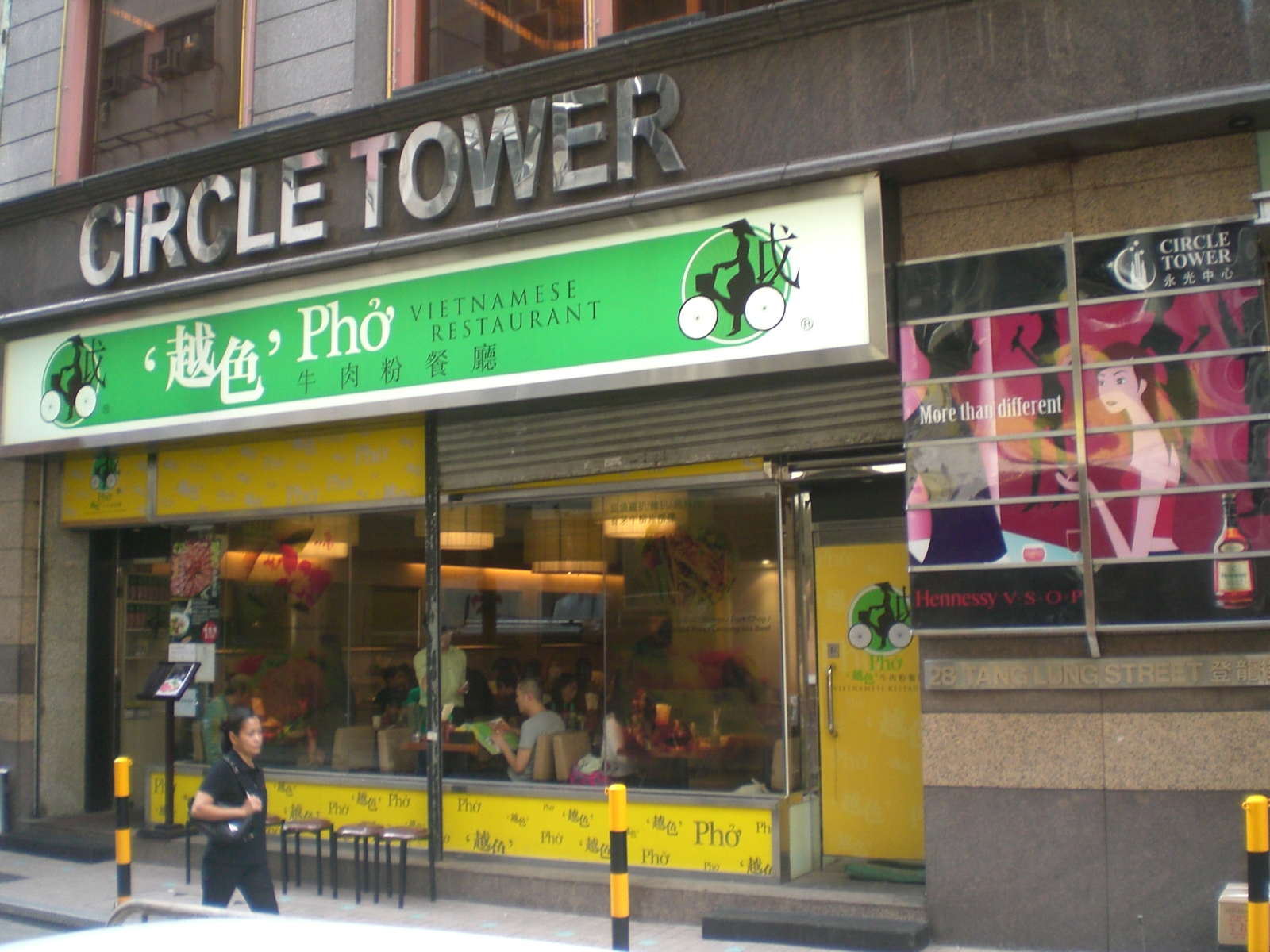
A Vietnamese restaurant in Hong Kong

There were 54,341 Vietnamese boat people in Hong Kong at the end of June 1990. About 20% of them were classified as refugees, 20% as not refugees, and 60% were waiting to be screened. The first forced repatriation took place on 12 December 1989, and involved 52 Vietnamese boat people. The poor public relation handling of the action led to an international outcry. The number of Vietnamese boat people in Hong Kong peaked at 64,300 in October 1991. In the early 1990s, the Hong Kong government began an orderly repatriation programme. It began as a voluntary programme, but it was poorly received by the Vietnamese migrants, despite an agreement with the Vietnamese government that barred retributions against the migrants upon their return. Eventually, the Hong Kong government decided to forcibly repatriate the Vietnamese boat people.

The Comprehensive Plan of Action was carried out by 1994. During the late 1980s and 1990s, the Hong Kong government began to broadcast a Vietnamese radio announcement in an attempt to deter Vietnamese migrants from making way to Hong Kong. This came to be known as the Bắt đầu từ nay broadcast.

As the economic and political situation in Vietnam improved, and the flow of boat people was stemmed, Hong Kong's status as a first port of asylum was revoked on 9 January 1998. By mid-1998, there were 2,160 Vietnamese boat people in Hong Kong. However, until 2000, Hong Kong still issued identity cards to the boat people in Hong Kong in an effort to allow them to assimilate into the society.

=== 2000s ===
In February 2000, the Hong Kong government announced that it would widen the Local Resettlement Scheme for Vietnamese refugees and migrants, allowing 1,400 refugees and migrants to settle in Hong Kong. The plan applied to 973 refugees that have been stranded in Hong Kong, and 327 migrants whom the Vietnamese government refused to accept. It did not apply to Vietnamese illegal immigrants. While stating that Hong Kong would continue to enforce the policy of repatriating illegal immigrants from Vietnam, then-Secretary for Security Regina Ip also commented that "the only effective and durable solution" for the refugees and migrants was "complete integration", and that "Integration is a humanitarian solution, especially for the children of the [refugees] and [migrants] who were born in Hong Kong."

== Facilities ==
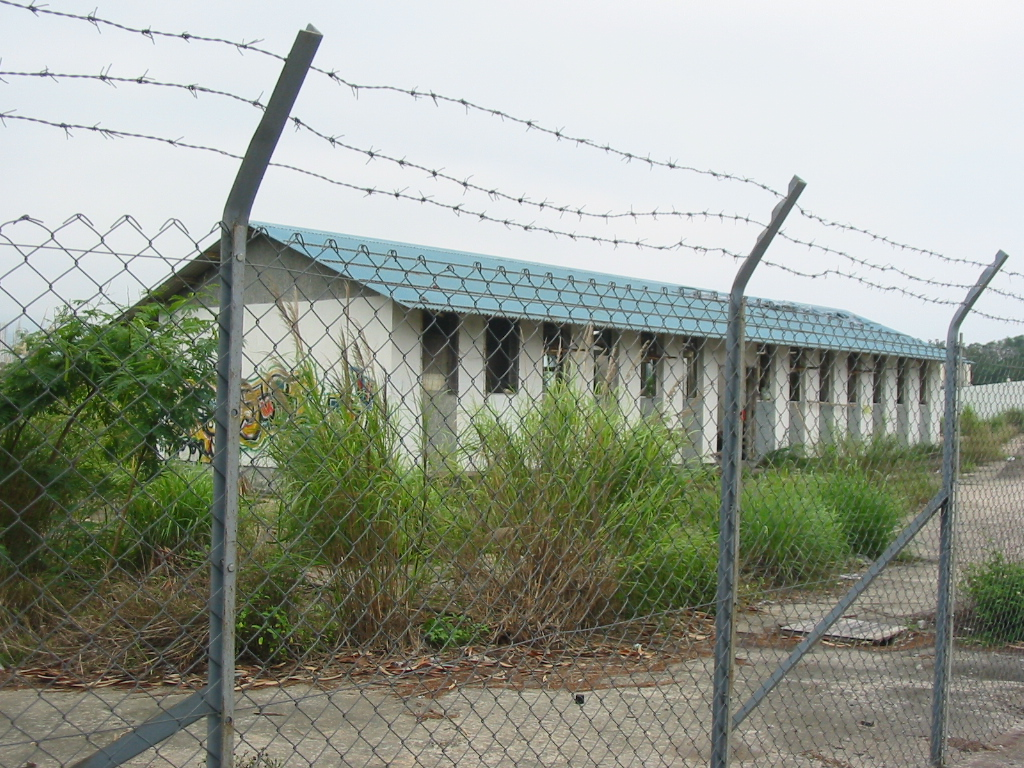
Whitehead camp in 2008.

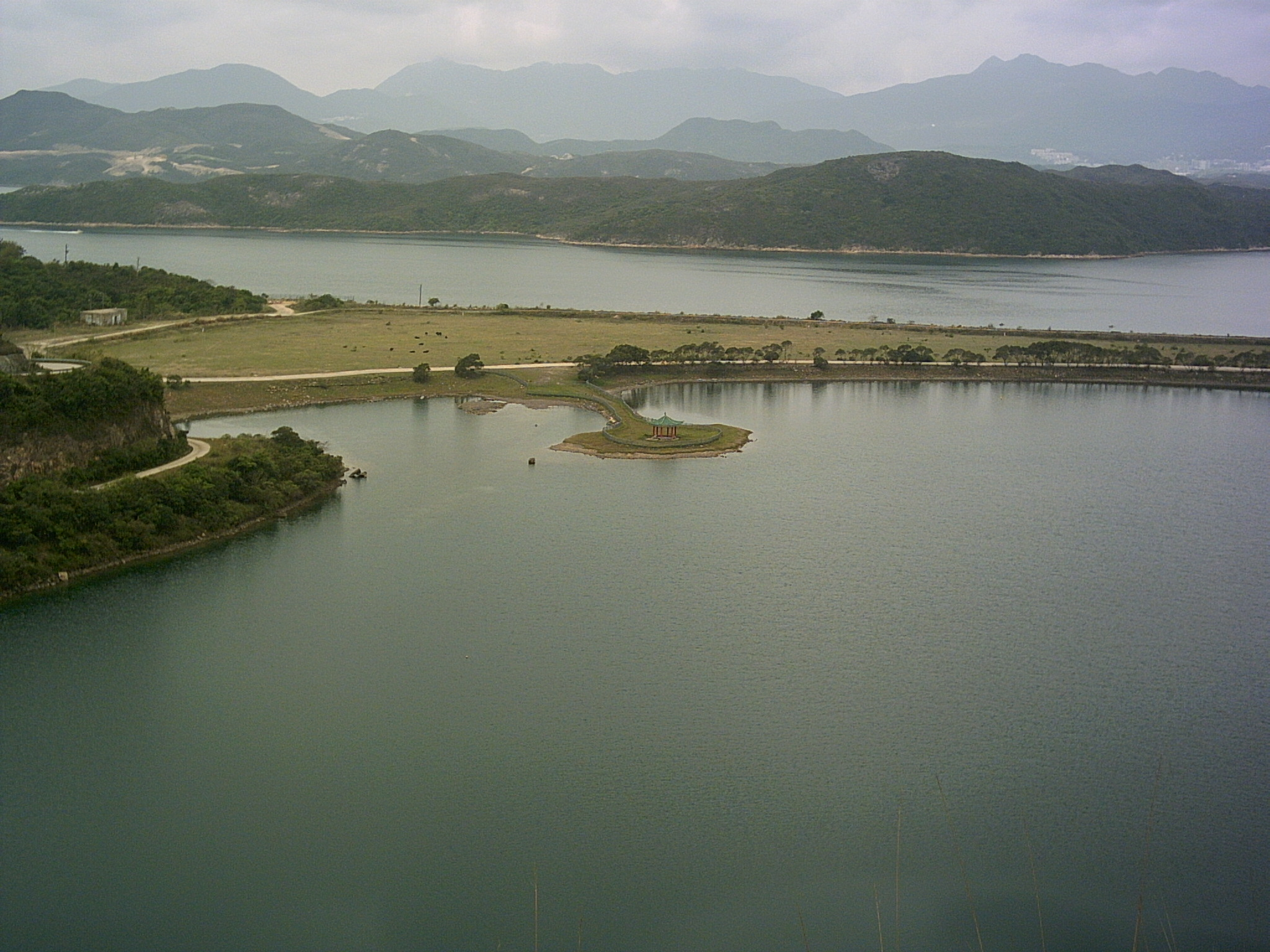
Site of the former High Island Detention Centre.

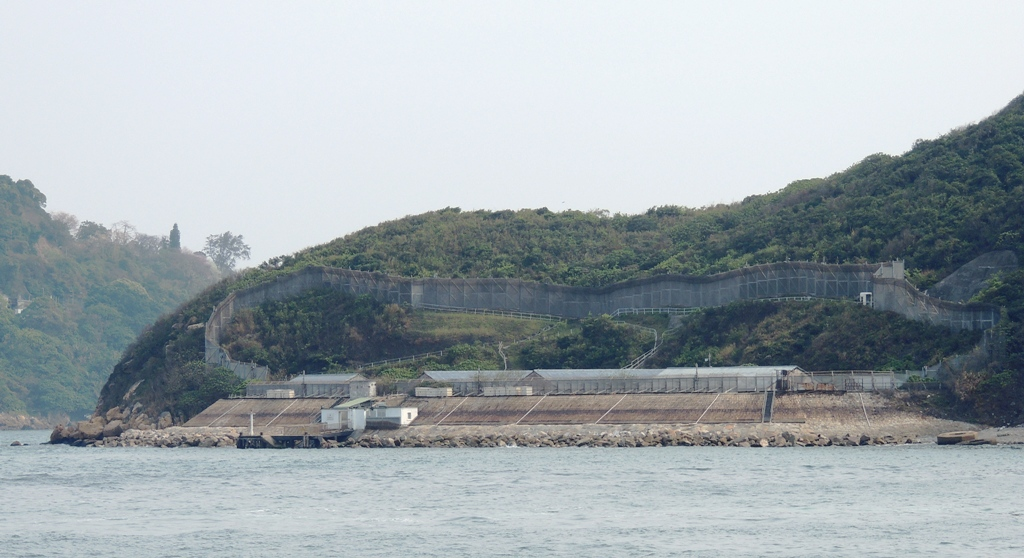
Green Island Reception Centre in 2013.

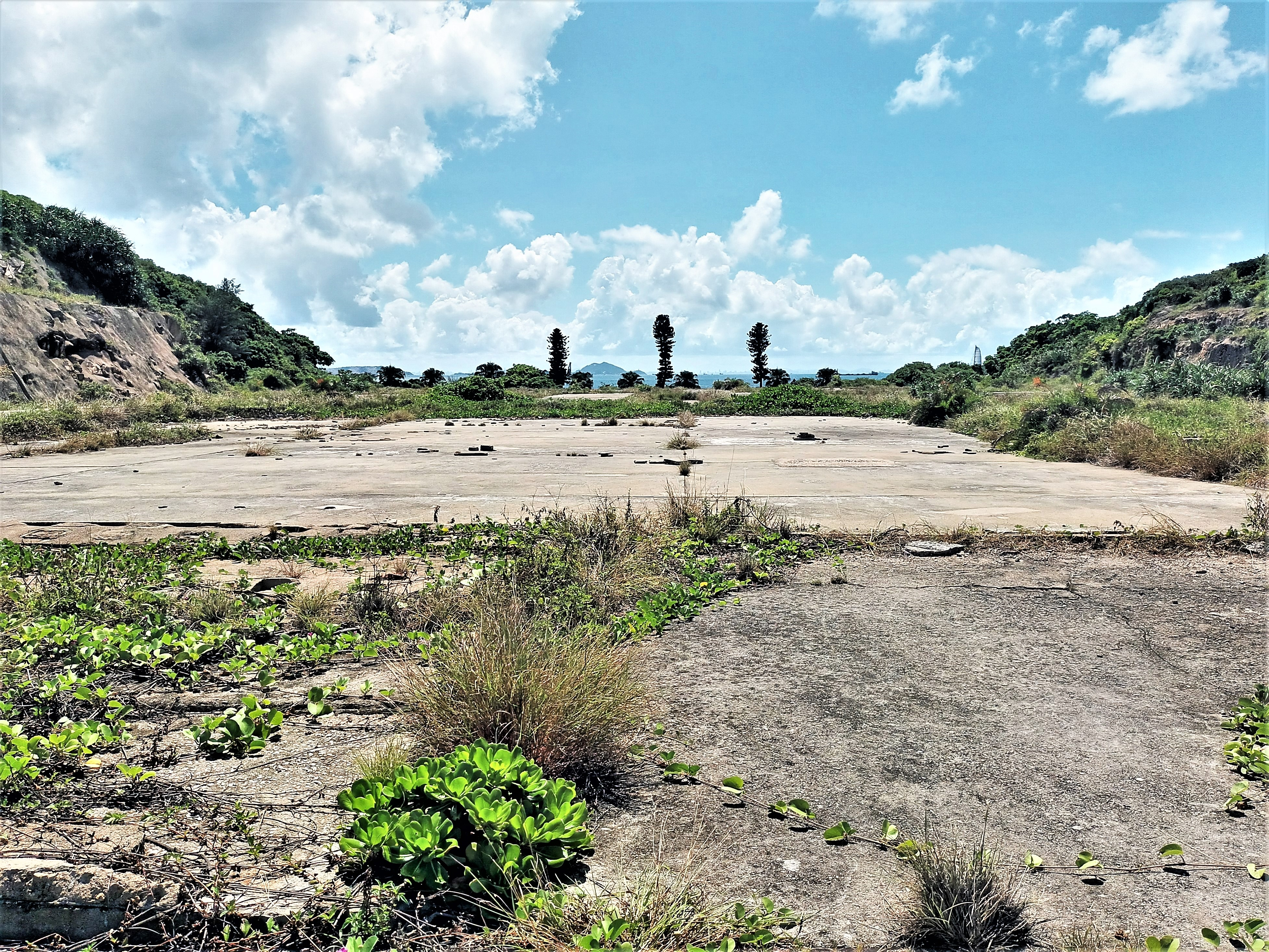
Site of Tai A Chau Detention Centre.

=== Timeline ===
The first batch of 3,743 refugees in 1975 had been settled in a civilian refugee camp in Chatham Road pending their resettlement. This camp was to be demolished in 1977.

Some 2,600 refugees aboard the vessel Skyluck which arrived on 7 February 1979 were refused landing due to a shortage of facilities, and were kept on board the vessel for over 4 months. The conditions were regarded as being superior to some terrestrial "transit camps".

In June 1979, a camp was set up on a site adjacent to the Police station at Sham Shui Po (closed March 1981), another was opened at Jubilee (closed November 1980); the Government opened the former army camp Argyle Street Camp to accommodate an estimated 20,000 refugees; the Kai Tak East Camp was set up to house an estimated 10,000; a 23-storey factory building in Tuen Mun to house an additional 16,000 was set up, temporary facilities were established at the Government Dockyard and Western Quarantine Anchorage.

The Chi Ma Wan Detention Centre would become the first closed camp after the Government passed the Immigration (Amendment) Bill 1982, set up on 2 July. Plans for a second camp, at Hei Ling Chau, were initiated at the end of July, shortly after the arrival of 1,523 refugees in the month. Another closed camp was set up in Cape Collinson.

The Whitehead camp was set up in Wu Kai Sha, Sha Tin District, to accommodate 28,000. Later, from June 1989, the runway of the former military airfield at Shek Kong was turned into a holding facility to house an estimated 7,000 refugees, amidst protests from local residents. Prior to the 1997 handover, the facility reverted to an airfield and is now used by the Chinese PLA Air Force.

=== List of facilities ===
Facilities included:

- Argyle Street Camp. The camp started accommodating Vietnamese refugees in June 1979, with a planned capacity of 20,000. Managed by the Civil Aid Service.
- Cape Collinson. Managed by the Correctional Services Department (CSD).
- Chi Ma Wan. Managed by the CSD.
- Green Island. Reception centre for new arrivals. Managed by the CSD.
- Hei Ling Chau. Managed by the CSD.
- High Island Detention Centre (萬宜羈留中心). Initially managed by Hong Kong Police, and then by the CSD from 1991. The construction of the Centre was delayed by two months after concerned Sai Kung residents staged a sit-in at the site. It opened in 1989 and closed in May 1998. During that period, more than 20,000 boat people passed through its doors.
- Kai Tak. The former Headquarters Building of the former RAF Kai Tak station housed the Kai Tak Vietnamese Refugee Camp (啟德越南難民營) between 1979 and 1981. The facility continued to be used for detaining Vietnamese refugees under different names until 1997.
- Lo Wu. Managed by Hong Kong Police.
- Nei Kwu (勵顧), Hei Ling Chau. Managed by the CSD.
- Pillar Point, Tuen Mun. The Pillar Point Vietnamese Refugees Centre (PPVRC) was the last Vietnamese refugee camp in activity. It closed on 31 May 2000.
- Sham Shui Po Barracks
- Shek Kong. Managed by Hong Kong Police. Opened in June 1989. 4,400 were accommodated there in tents in 1990.
- Tai A Chau Detention Centre. The Centre operated from the late 1980s to 1996. Initially set in rudimentary facilities, it was temporarily vacated after a cholera outbreak in September 1989. Purpose-built facilities were then erected and the Centre reopened in late 1990, managed by the Hong Kong Housing Services For Refugees, a company initially set up by UNHCR to run the Pillar Point Refugee Centre. The 5,500 detainees of the Centre were relocated to the Whitehead camp at the end of 1996. All the building structures were subsequently demolished.
- Tuen Mun. On 4 June 1979, the first 500 refugees moved into a 23-storey factory building rented by the Government in Hing Wong Street, with a planned capacity of 16,000.
- Whitehead Detention Centre (白石羈留中心), in Wu Kai Sha, Sha Tin District. Managed by the CSD. The largest centre by far, with 25,000 in 1990.

== Financial cost ==
The Security Branch revealed that, as at January 1983, the total cash outlay due to feeding and accommodating refugees had amounted to HKD 270 million, of which HKD 110 million was borne by Hong Kong, HKD120 million by the UNHCR, and the remainder by international agencies.

The United Nations owed Hong Kong HKD 1.61 billion for its handling of Vietnamese boat people. The loan is still outstanding.

== Residents from Vietnam / Hong Kong Hoa ==
Immigrants prior to 1970s were mainly Hoa leaving Vietnam due to anti-Chinese sentiment. A handful of notable Hong Kong residents came during this period, including:

- Ray Lui, Hong Kong actor left Vietnam in 1967
- Tsui Hark, Hong Kong director, screenwriter left Vietnam in 1963
- Wan Kwong, Hong Kong Cantonese opera singer left Vietnam in the 1960s
- Mary Jean Reimer, Hong Kong actress moved to Hong Kong in 1965
- Wong Kwok-hing, Hong Kong union leader and member of the Legco

Actor brothers François Wong and Stefan Wong were born in Hong Kong, of Hoa origin.

== See also ==
- Indochina refugee crisis following the Fall of Saigon
- Vietnamese migrant brides in China
- Vietnamese migrant brides in Taiwan
