= Vietnamese boat people =

Refugees who fled Vietnam by boat

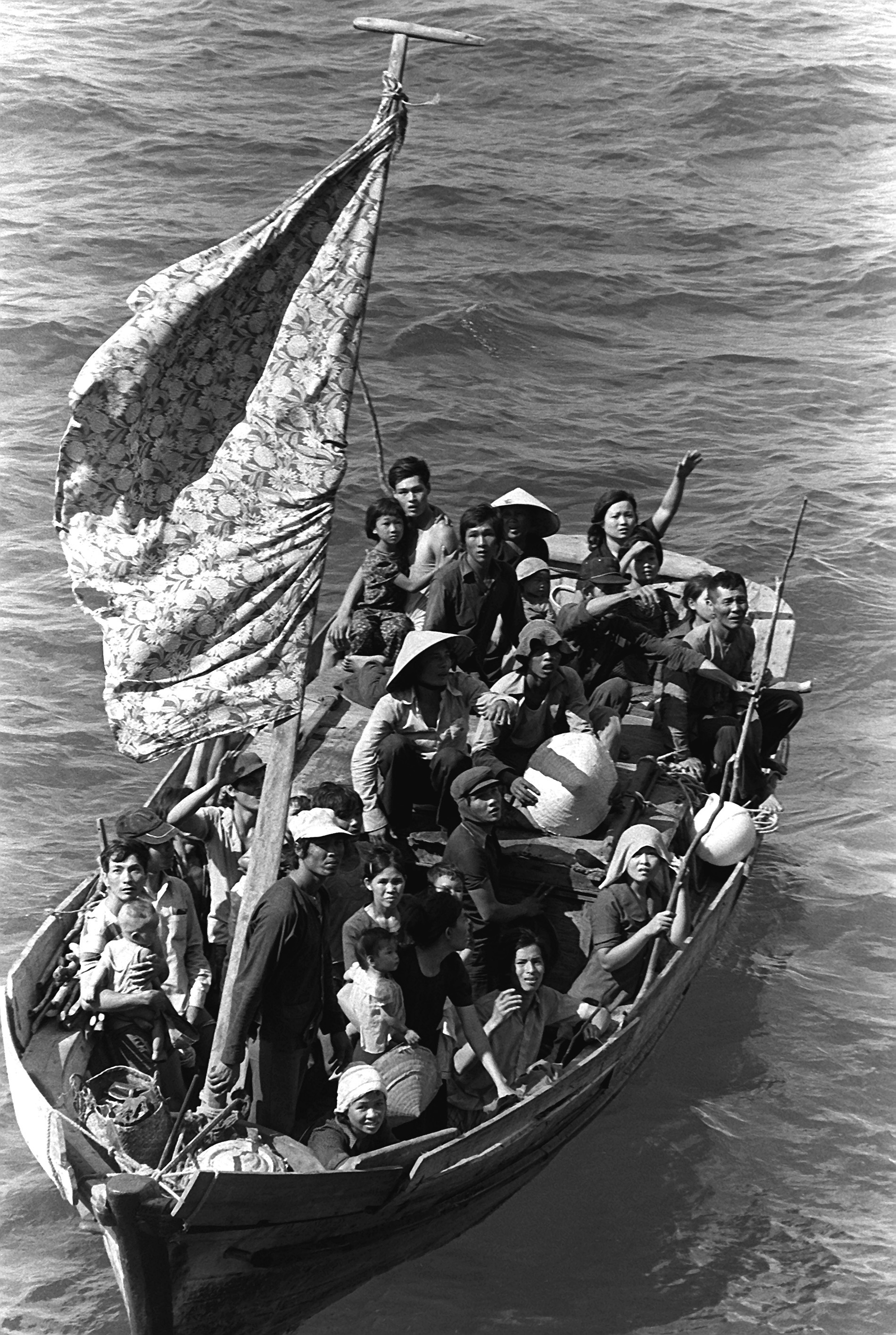
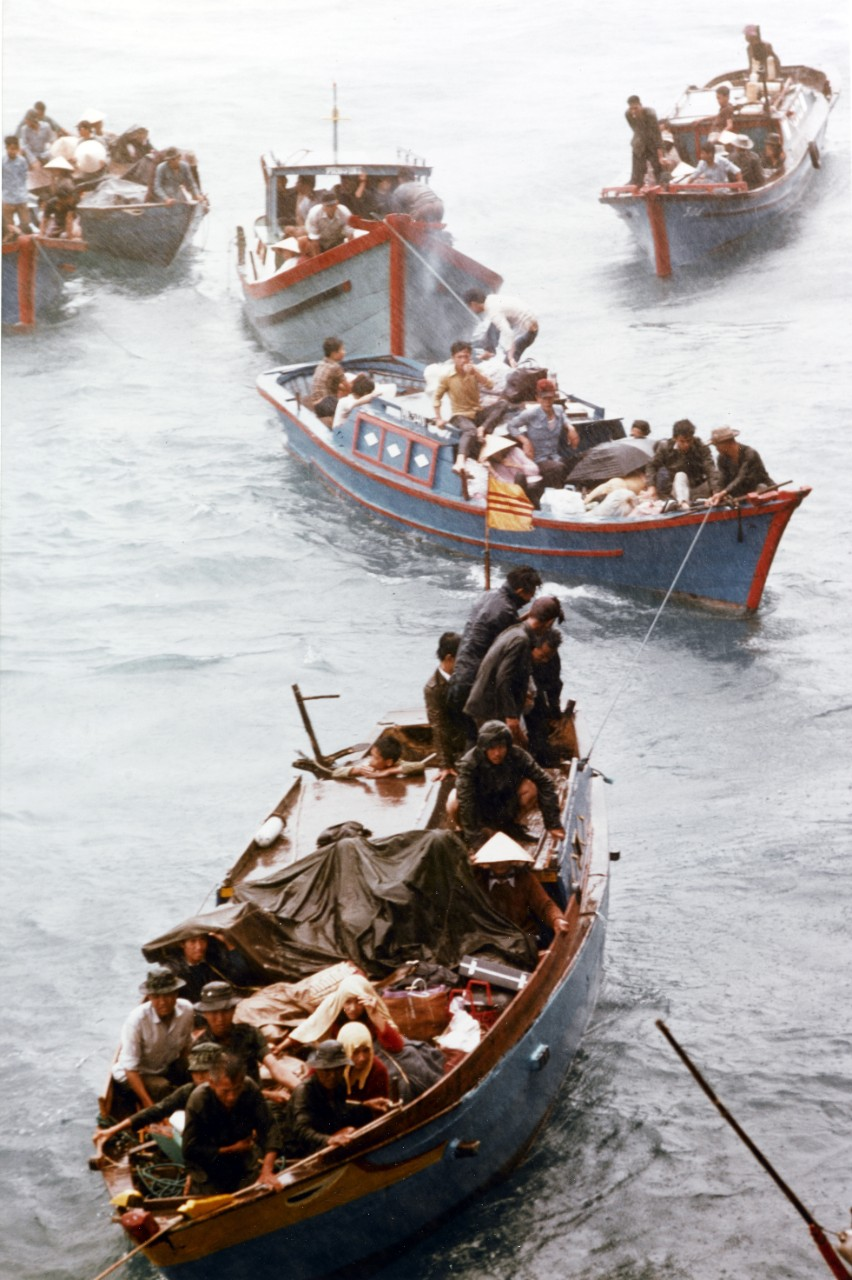
Vietnamese boat people awaiting rescue (left) and boats of refugees approaching USS Durham (right).

Vietnamese boat people (Vietnamese: Thuyền nhân Việt Nam) were refugees who fled Vietnam by sea following the 1975 fall of Saigon, which marked the end of the Vietnam War. This migration and humanitarian crisis peaked in the late 1970s and early 1980s before continuing into the 1990s. Between 1975 and 1995, almost 800,000 boat people arrived safely in other countries, while many others died at sea due to piracy, overcrowding, and storms. Political repression, re-education camps and the expropriation of Hoa properties by the Vietnamese communist government, economic hardship, and conflicts such as the Third Indochina War, contributed to the wider Indochina refugee crisis.

Tensions between Vietnam and China in 1978 and 1979 contributed to the departure of large numbers of ethnic Hoa people from Vietnam, many of whom fled by boat. Anti-Chinese sentiment and regional conflict further accelerated this exodus. The number of people who died is hard to establish because of the lack of reliable data and the political instrumentalization of the topic. The United Nations High Commission for Refugees (UNHCR) estimates that between 200,000 and 250,000 boat people died at sea. In 1981, Australian journalist Barry Wain put forward a figure of 30,000 people dead at sea.

The boat people's first destinations were Hong Kong and the Southeast Asian locations of Indonesia, Malaysia, the Philippines, Singapore, and Thailand. Southeast Asian countries grew increasingly unwilling to accept additional arrivals. Following negotiations and an international conference in 1979, Vietnam agreed to limit departures. Southeast Asian countries agreed to grant temporary asylum, while more developed countries assumed most resettlement responsibilities and costs. Consequently, from refugee camps in Southeast Asia, the great majority of boat people were resettled in the United States, Canada, Italy, Australia, France, West Germany, and the United Kingdom. Several tens of thousands were repatriated to Vietnam. The UNHCR coordinated initiatives such as the Orderly Departure Program, the Philippine Refugee Processing Center, and the Comprehensive Plan of Action to facilitate resettlement.

== Background ==
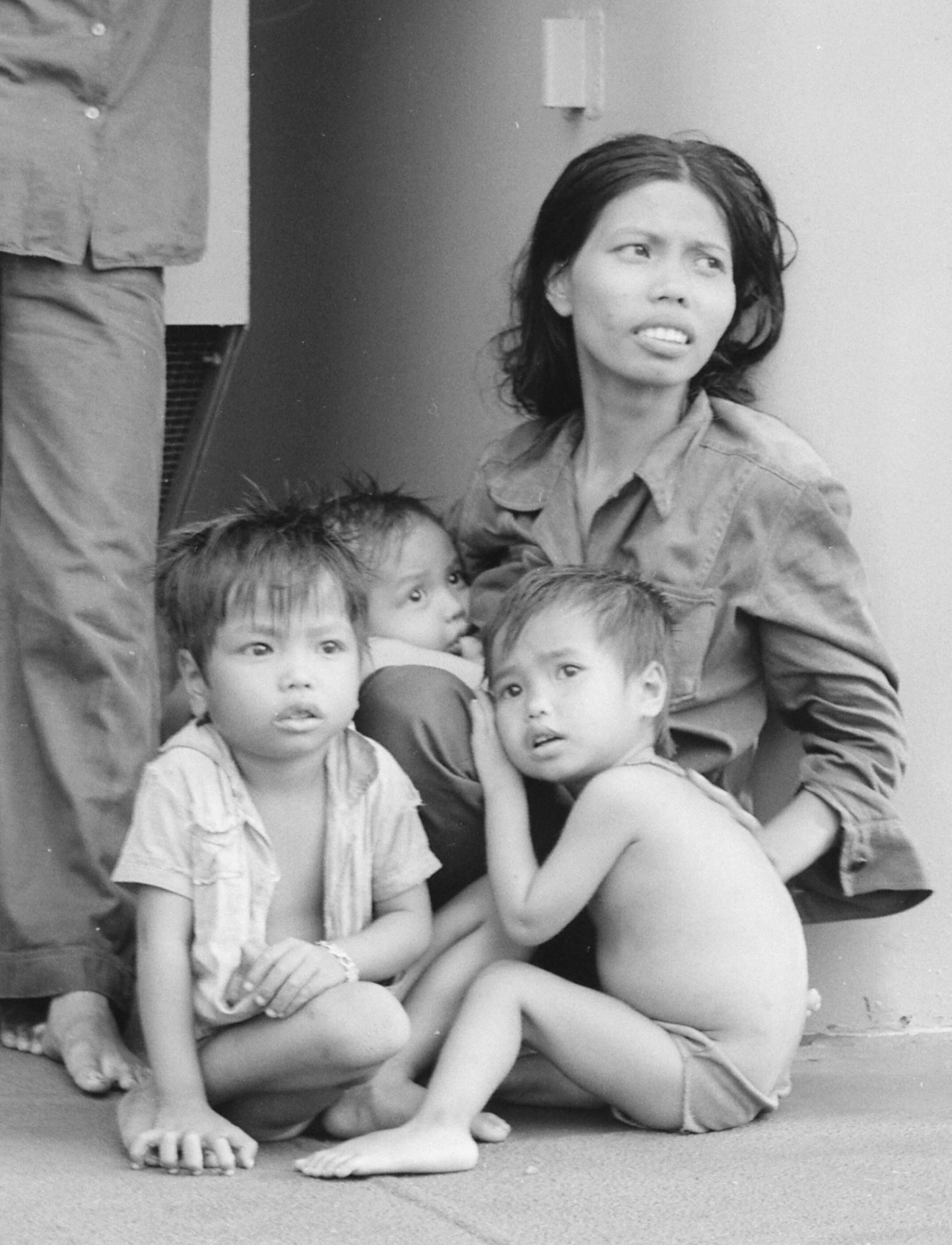
A family of Vietnamese refugees rescued by a US Navy ship

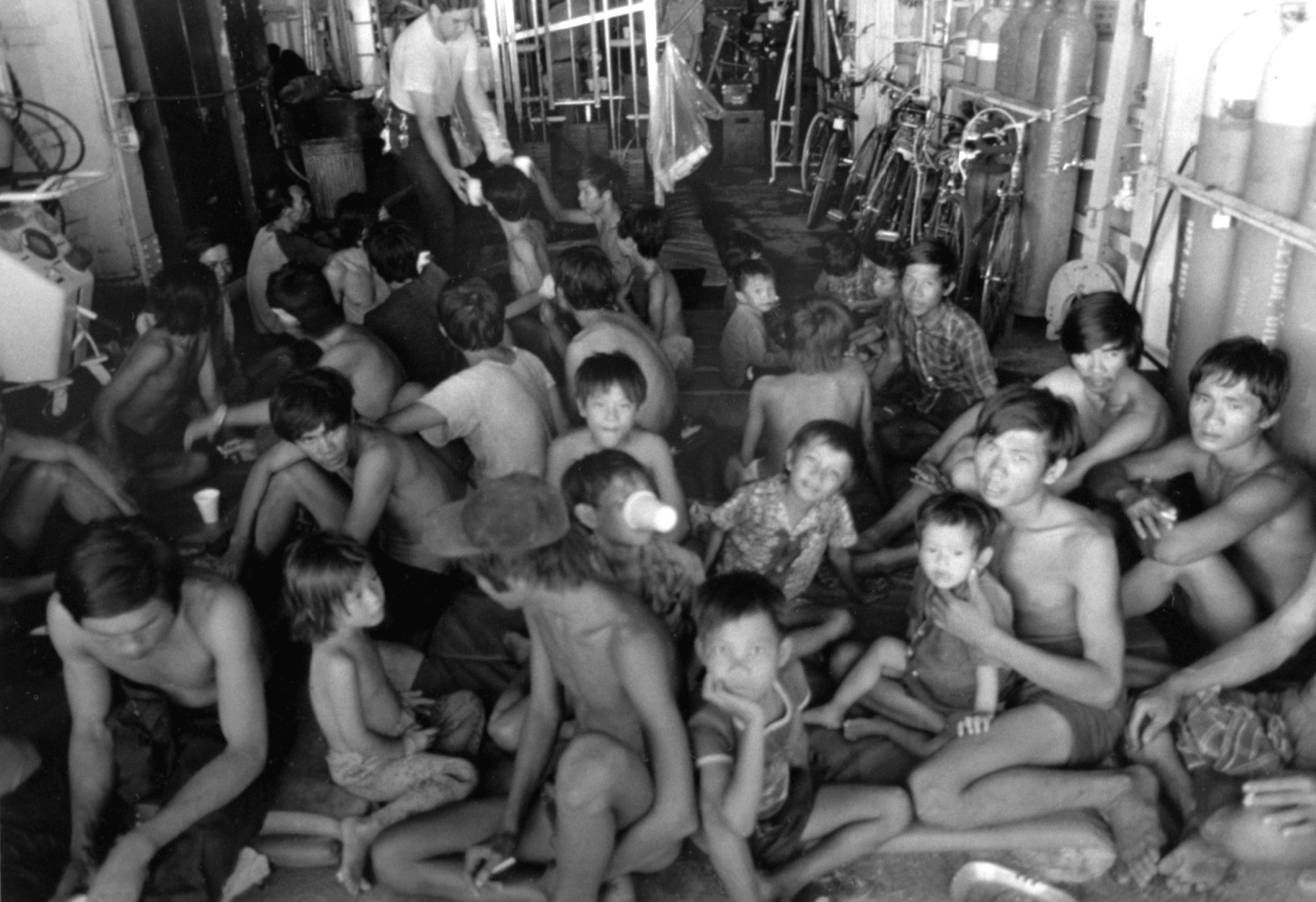
Rescued Vietnamese being given water

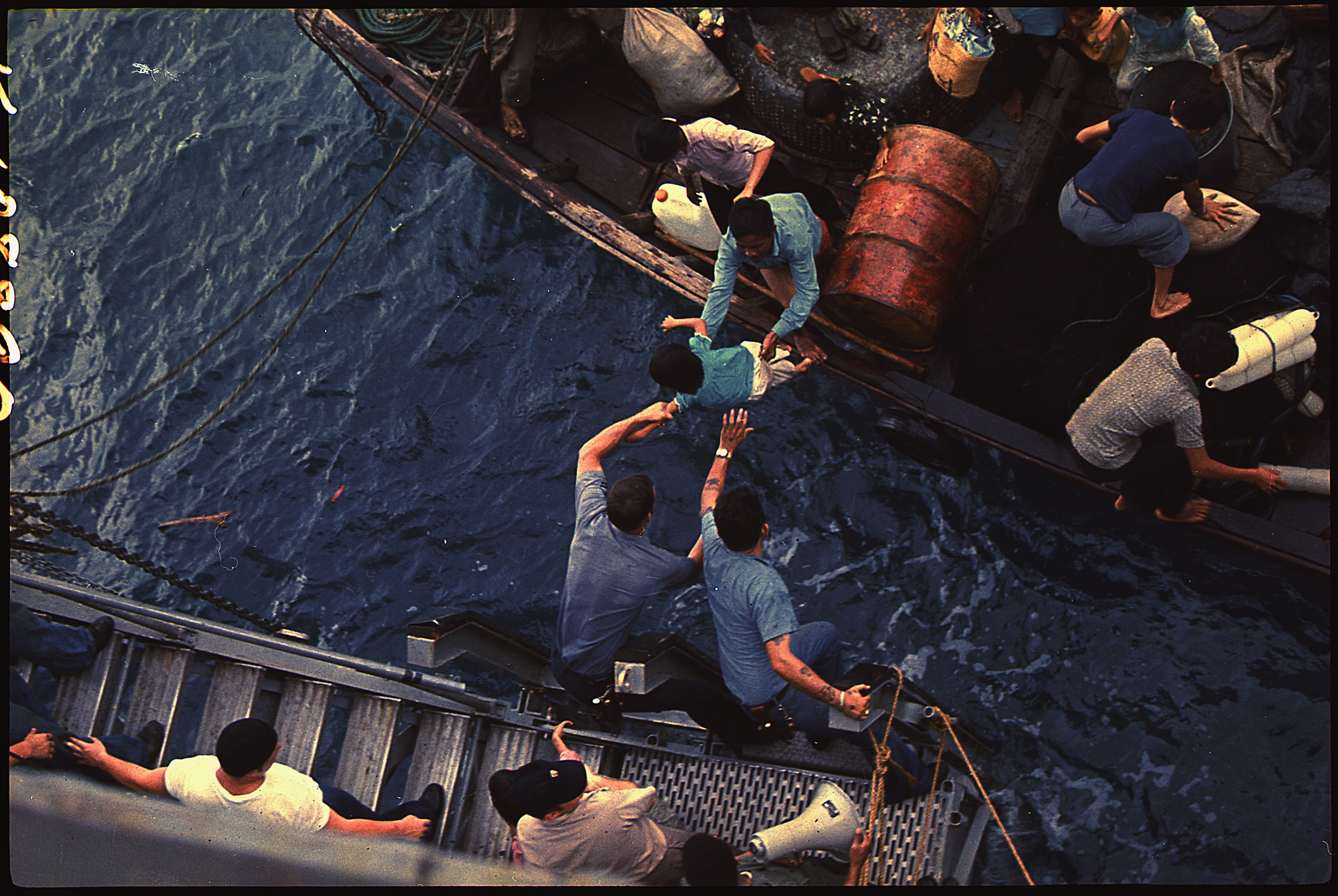
South China Sea, crewmen of the amphibious cargo ship USS Durham (LKA-114) take Vietnamese refugees from a small craft, April 1975.

The Vietnam War ended on 30 April 1975, with the fall of Saigon to the People's Army of Vietnam and the subsequent evacuation of more than 130,000 Vietnamese closely associated with the United States or the former government of South Vietnam. Most of the evacuees were resettled in the United States in Operation New Life and Operation New Arrivals. The U.S. government transported refugees from Vietnam via aircraft and ships to temporarily settle down in Guam before moving them to designated homes in the contiguous United States. Within the same year, communist forces gained control of Cambodia and Laos, thus engendering a steady flow of refugees fleeing all three countries. In 1975, President Gerald Ford signed the Indochina Migration and Refugee Assistance Act, budgeting roughly 455 million dollars in the effort to provide transportation, healthcare, and accommodations to the 130,000 Vietnamese, Cambodian, and Lao refugees.

After the Saigon evacuation, the number of Vietnamese leaving their country remained relatively small until mid-1978. A number of factors contributed to the refugee crisis, including economic hardship and wars in Vietnam, China, and Cambodia. In addition, up to 300,000 people, especially those associated with the former government and military of South Vietnam, were sent to re-education camps, where many endured torture, starvation, and disease while being forced to perform hard labor. In addition, 1 million people, mostly city dwellers, "volunteered" to live in "New Economic Zones" where they were to survive by reclaiming land and clearing jungle to grow crops.

Repression was especially severe on the Hoa people, the ethnic Chinese population in Vietnam. Due to increasing tensions between Vietnam and China, which ultimately resulted in China's 1979 invasion of Vietnam, the Hoa were seen by the Vietnamese government as a security threat. Hoa people also controlled much of the retail trade in South Vietnam, and the communist government increasingly levied them with taxes, placed restrictions on trade, and confiscated businesses. In May 1978, the Hoa began to leave Vietnam in large numbers for China, initially by land. By the end of 1979, resulting from the Sino-Vietnamese War, 250,000 Hoa had sought refuge in China and many tens of thousands more were among the Vietnamese boat people scattered all over Southeast Asia and in Hong Kong.

The Vietnamese government and its officials profited from the outflow of refugees, especially the often well-to-do Hoa. The price for obtaining exit permits, documentation, and a boat or ship, often derelict, to leave Vietnam was reported to be the equivalent of $3,000 for adults and half that for children. These payments were often made in the form of gold bars. Many poorer Vietnamese left their country secretly without documentation and in flimsy boats, and these were the most vulnerable to pirates and storms while at sea.

There were many methods employed by Vietnamese citizens to leave the country. Most were secret and done at night; some involved the bribing of top government officials. Some people bought places in large boats that hold up to several hundred passengers. Others boarded fishing boats (fishing being a common occupation in Vietnam) and left that way. One method used involved middle-class refugees from Saigon, armed with forged identity documents, traveling approximately 1,100 kilometres (680 mi) to Da Nang by road. On arrival, they would take refuge for up to two days in safe houses while waiting for fishing junks and trawlers to take small groups into international waters. Planning for such a trip took many months and even years. Although these attempts often caused a depletion of resources, people often had false starts before they managed to escape.

== Exodus in 1978–1979 ==
Although a few thousand people had fled Vietnam by boat between 1975 and mid-1978, the exodus of the boat people began in September 1978. The vessel Southern Cross unloaded 1,200 Vietnamese on an uninhabited island belonging to Indonesia. The government of Indonesia was furious at the people being dumped on its shores, but was pacified by the assurances of Western countries that they would resettle the refugees. In October 1978, another ship, the Hai Hong, attempted to land 2,500 refugees in Malaysia. The Malaysians declined to allow them to enter their territory and the ship sat offshore until the refugees were processed for resettlement in third countries. More large ships carrying thousands of refugees began to arrive in Hong Kong territorial waters: the Huey Fong in December 1978 (3,318 refugees), the Skyluck, disguised as the Kylu, in February 1979 (2,651 refugees), and the Seng Cheong, disguised as the Sen On, in May (1,433 refugees). Their passengers were both ethnic Vietnamese and Hoa who had paid substantial fares for the passage.

As these larger ships met resistance to landing their human cargo, many thousands of Vietnamese began to depart Vietnam in small boats, attempting to land surreptitiously on the shores of neighbouring countries. The people in these small boats faced enormous dangers at sea and many thousands of them did not survive the voyage. The countries of the region often "pushed back" the boats when they arrived near their coastline and boat people cast about at sea for weeks or months looking for a place where they could land. Despite the dangers and the resistance of the receiving countries, the number of boat people continued to grow, reaching a high of 54,000 arrivals in the month of June 1979, with a total of 350,000 in refugee camps in Southeast Asia and Hong Kong. At this point, the countries of Southeast Asia united in declaring that they had "reached the limit of their endurance and decided that they would not accept any new arrivals".

The United Nations convened an international conference in Geneva, Switzerland in July 1979, stating that "a grave crisis exists in Southeast Asia for hundreds of thousands of refugees". Illustrating the prominence of the issue, Vice President Walter Mondale headed the U.S. delegation. The results of the conference were that the Southeast Asian countries agreed to provide temporary asylum to the refugees, Vietnam agreed to promote orderly departures rather than permit boat people to depart, and the Western countries agreed to accelerate resettlement. The Orderly Departure Program enabled Vietnamese, if approved, to depart Vietnam for resettlement in another country without having to become a boat person. As a result of the conference, boat people departures from Vietnam declined to a few thousand per month and resettlements increased from 9,000 per month in early 1979 to 25,000 per month, the majority of the Vietnamese going to the United States, France, Australia, and Canada. The worst of the humanitarian crisis was over, although boat people would continue to leave Vietnam for more than another decade and die at sea or be confined to lengthy stays in refugee camps.

== Pirates and other hazards ==
Boat people had to face storms, diseases, starvation, and elude pirates. The boats were not intended for navigating open waters, and would typically head for busy international shipping lanes some 240 kilometres (150 mi) to the east. Additionally, these boats were especially vulnerable due to the lack of weapons to defend themselves as it was difficult to obtain unauthorized weapons in Vietnam at the time. Before 1983 around 20% of boat people were rescued by freighters, but that percentage declined the following years. These lucky ones would reach shore 1–2 weeks after departure. The unlucky ones continued their perilous journey at sea, sometimes lasting a few months long, suffering from hunger, thirst, disease, theft and more attacks before finding safety.

A typical story of the hazards faced by the boat people was told in 1982 by a man named Le Phuoc. He left Vietnam with 17 other people in a boat 23 feet (7.0 m) long to attempt the 300-mile (480 km) passage across the Gulf of Thailand to southern Thailand or Malaysia. Their two outboard motors soon failed and they drifted without power and ran out of food and water. Thai pirates boarded their boat three times during their 17-day voyage, raped the four women on board and killed one, stole all the possessions of the refugees, and abducted one man who was never found. When their boat sank, they were rescued by a Thai fishing boat and ended up in a refugee camp on the coast of Thailand. Another of many stories tell of a boat carrying 75 refugees which were sunk by pirates with one person surviving. The survivors of another boat in which most of the 21 women aboard were abducted by pirates said that at least 50 merchant vessels passed them by and ignored their pleas for help. An Argentine freighter finally picked them up and took them to Thailand.

As attacks such as these became common some have linked the rise in piracy with neighboring countries' desire to keep refugees out. The 1979 ASEAN announcement essentially declared there would be no official protections offered by neighboring governments. In this way the known threat of piracy was being used as a tool of state policy. Throughout time, professional pirates operating together replaced lone fishermen in Southeast Asian piracy. Piracy in the Gulf of Thailand swiftly developed into a highly coordinated industry, with multiple fishing vessels encircling and assaulting a refugee craft in coordinated attacks.

The United Nations High Commissioner for Refugees (UNHCR) began compiling statistics on piracy in 1981. In that year, 452 boats carrying Vietnamese boat people arrived in Thailand carrying 15,479 refugees; 349 of the boats had been attacked by pirates an average of three times each, while 228 women had been abducted and 881 people were dead or missing. An international anti-piracy campaign known as the Anti-Piracy Arrangement began in June 1982 and was made up of Australia, Canada, Denmark, France, Germany, Italy, Japan, the Netherlands, Norway, Switzerland, the United Kingdom, and the United States with a total funding of £3.6 million. In the first year of the program the number of recorded piracy attacks dropped 67%, and continued to fall until a deadly resurgence of piracy in 1988 and 1989, just before the end of the Hoa exodus. According to author Nghia M. Vo and the UNHCR, between 200,000 and 250,000 boat people died at sea.

== Refugee camps ==
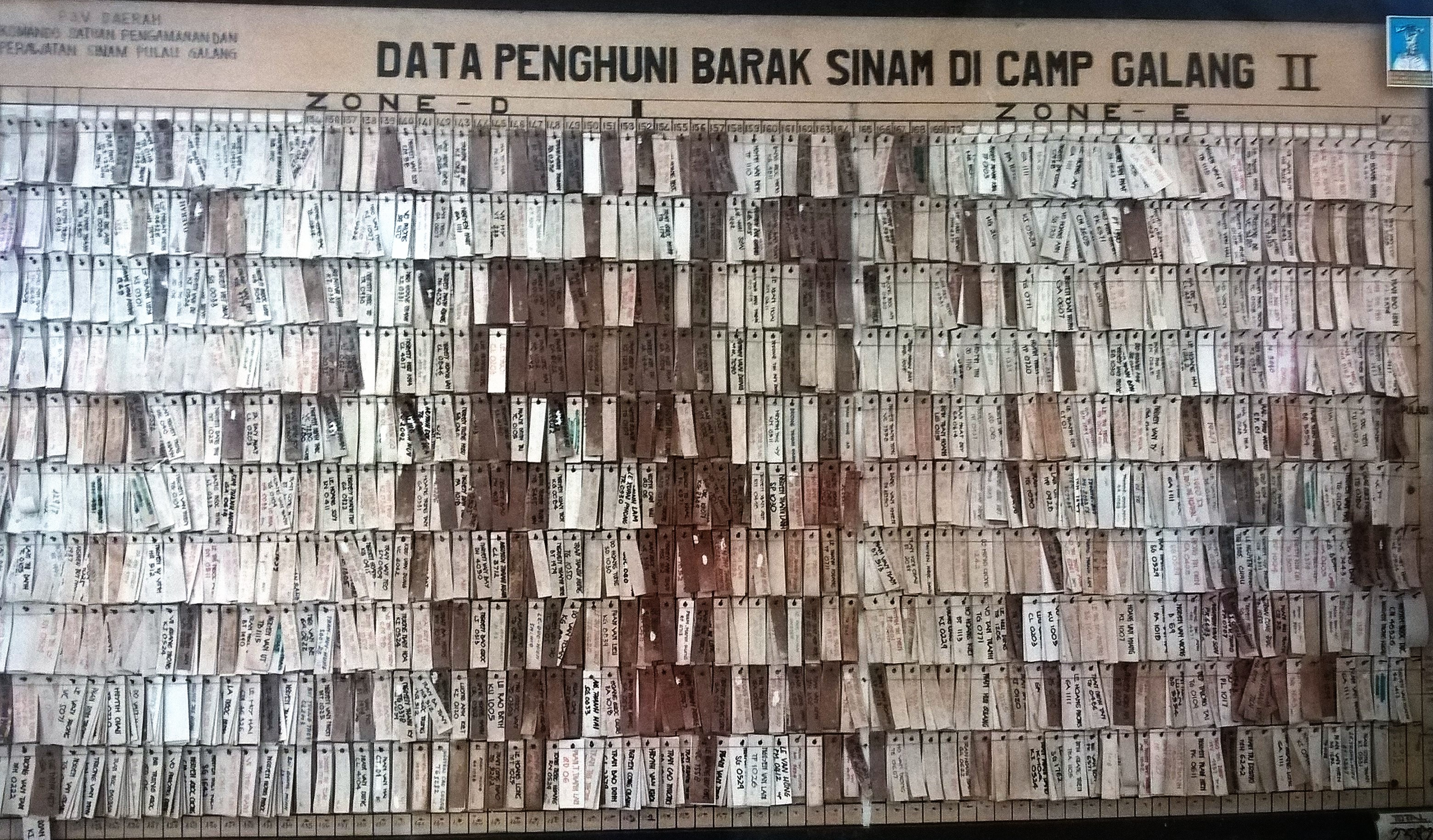
Stacks of refugee identification cards on Galang Refugee Camp in Indonesia, Zone D and E. There were approximately 250.000 refuges recorded on the island.

In response to the outpouring of boat people, the neighbouring countries with international assistance set up refugee camps along their shores and on small, isolated islands. As the number of boat people grew to tens of thousands per month in early 1979, their numbers outstripped the ability of local governments, the UN, and humanitarian organizations to provide food, water, housing, and medical care to them. Two of the largest refugee camps were Bidong Island in Malaysia and Galang Refugee Camp in Indonesia.

In response to the increasing numbers of refugees pouring in following the results of the Vietnam War the Malaysian island, Pulao Bidong, was transformed in into a refugee camp by the Malaysian government and the Red Crescent Society. Bidong Island was designated as the principal refugee camp in Malaysia in August 1978. The Malaysian government towed any arriving boatloads of refugees to the island. Less than one square mile in area, Bidong was prepared to receive 4,500 refugees, but by June 1979 Bidong had a refugee population of more than 40,000 who had arrived in 453 boats. While Malaysia was crucial in providing help and support to refugees entering their shores, many other countries provided refuge, such as Japan, Singapore, Thailand, the Philippines, and the United States.

The UNHCR and a large number of relief and aid organizations assisted the refugees. However, converting a largely uninhabited islands proved to be a challenge to accommodate thousands of boat refugees. The only habitable areas on the island were the beaches, vegetation was plundered for shelter and firewood, and shallow wells were constructed for fresh water. Sanitation in the crowded conditions was the greatest problem. In terms of a functioning sewage system, the camps faced issues where sewage tanks and taps were either stolen or corroded. Traps and pipes filled quickly with waste and were quickly infested with rat populations. Food and drinking water had to be imported by barge. Water was rationed at one gallon per day per person. The food ration was mostly rice and canned meat and vegetables. The refugees constructed crude shelters from boat timbers, plastic sheeting, flattened tin cans, and palm fronds.

Organization within respective refugee camps created feelings of apathy between its inhabitants, where it was common that men were given few opportunities to participate in their customary work and instead subjected to menial or unusual work. Conditions between different camps varied, however a common theme felt between the inhabitants were that life in the camps could best be described as "meaningless, pacifying, and time wasting". The United States and other governments had representatives on the island to interview refugees for resettlement. With the expansion of the numbers to be resettled after the July 1979 Geneva Conference, the population of Bidong slowly declined. The last refugee left in 1991.

The Galang Refugee Camp was also on an island that was transformed by work of the Indonesian government, Red Crescent Society, and UNHCR, but with a much larger area than Bidong. Located in Riau Province of Indonesia, the Galang Refugee Camp lies in the center of Pulao Galang, a sixteen-square-kilometer island much bigger than Bidong Island's one square mile. More than 170,000 Indochinese, the great majority of boat people, were temporary residents at Galang while it served as a refugee camp from 1975 until 1996. After they became well-established, Galang and Bidong and other refugee camps provided education, language and cultural training to boat people who would be resettled abroad. Refugees usually had to live in camps for several months—and sometimes years—before being resettled.

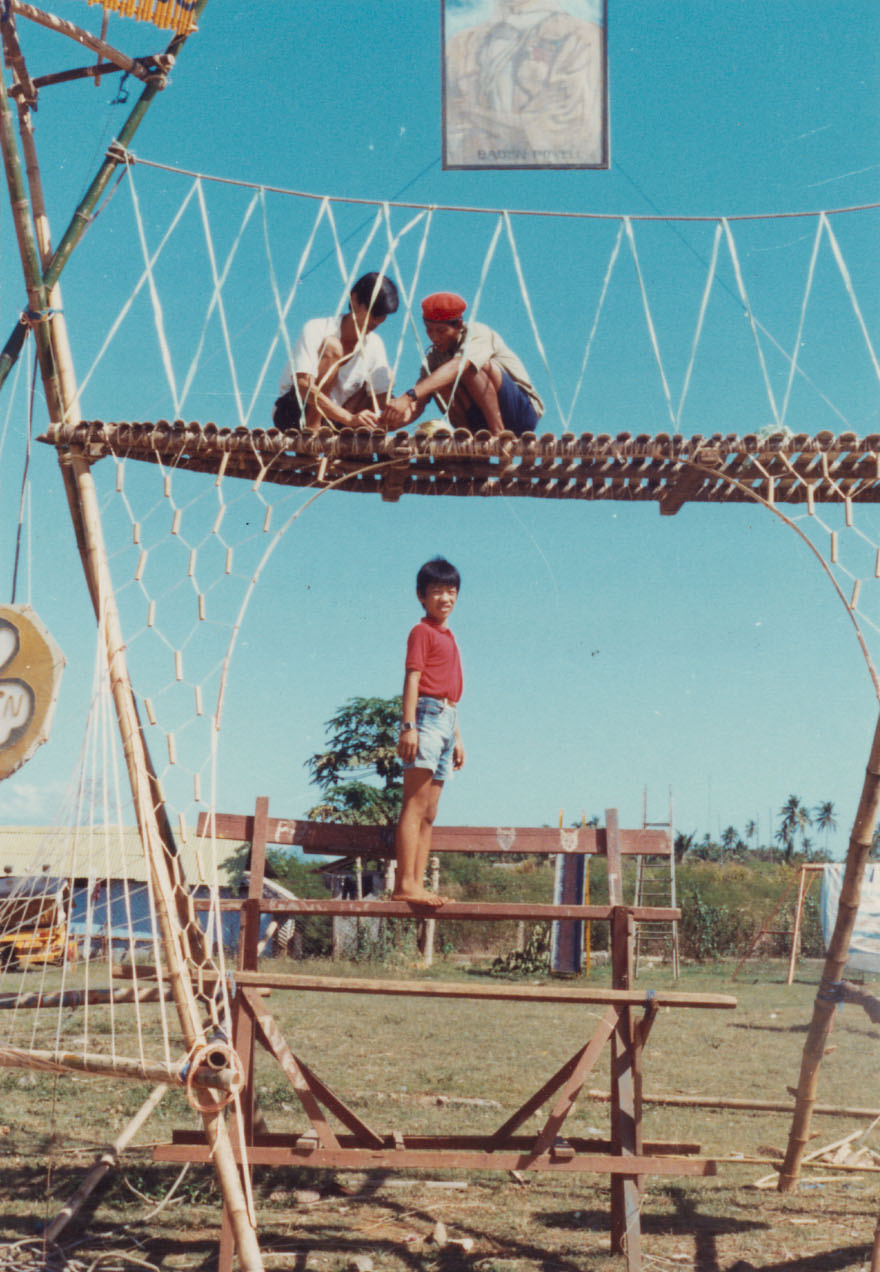
Vietnamese Boy Scouts at the Philippine First Asylum Center in Palawan (1990)

In 1980, the Philippine Refugee Processing Center was established on the Bataan Peninsula in the Philippines. The Philippine Refugee Processing Center (PRPC) was initially only able to house 7,000 refugees but then quickly expanded to be able to provide housing for up to 50,000 refugees. While the PRPC could house up to 50,000 people, the camp's peak population was approximately 17,000 refugees. Initially, the PRPC was formed as a way to alleviate other countries from the issue of crowding that was occurring in different refugee camps due to the sudden surge of refugees. The PRPC would shift its goals from just providing temporary refuge to becoming a training or processing as the number of refugees slowed down. The PRPC would center its teachings on helping the refugees learn and assimilate into the United States when they finish their resettlement process.

In 2005, after the resettlement of thousands of refugees from Pulau Bidong and Pulau Galang, a group of former boat refugees returned to commemorate their experiences at the camps. Two memorials were erected in honor of those who had perished during their journey and expressed gratitude towards the assistance they had received from local governments. However, soon after, they were demolished due to controversy between the Vietnamese, Malaysian, and Indonesian governments. The islands had been permanently closed to the public until the turn of the twenty-first century, due to the growth of tourism in Terengganu.

== 1980s surge and response ==
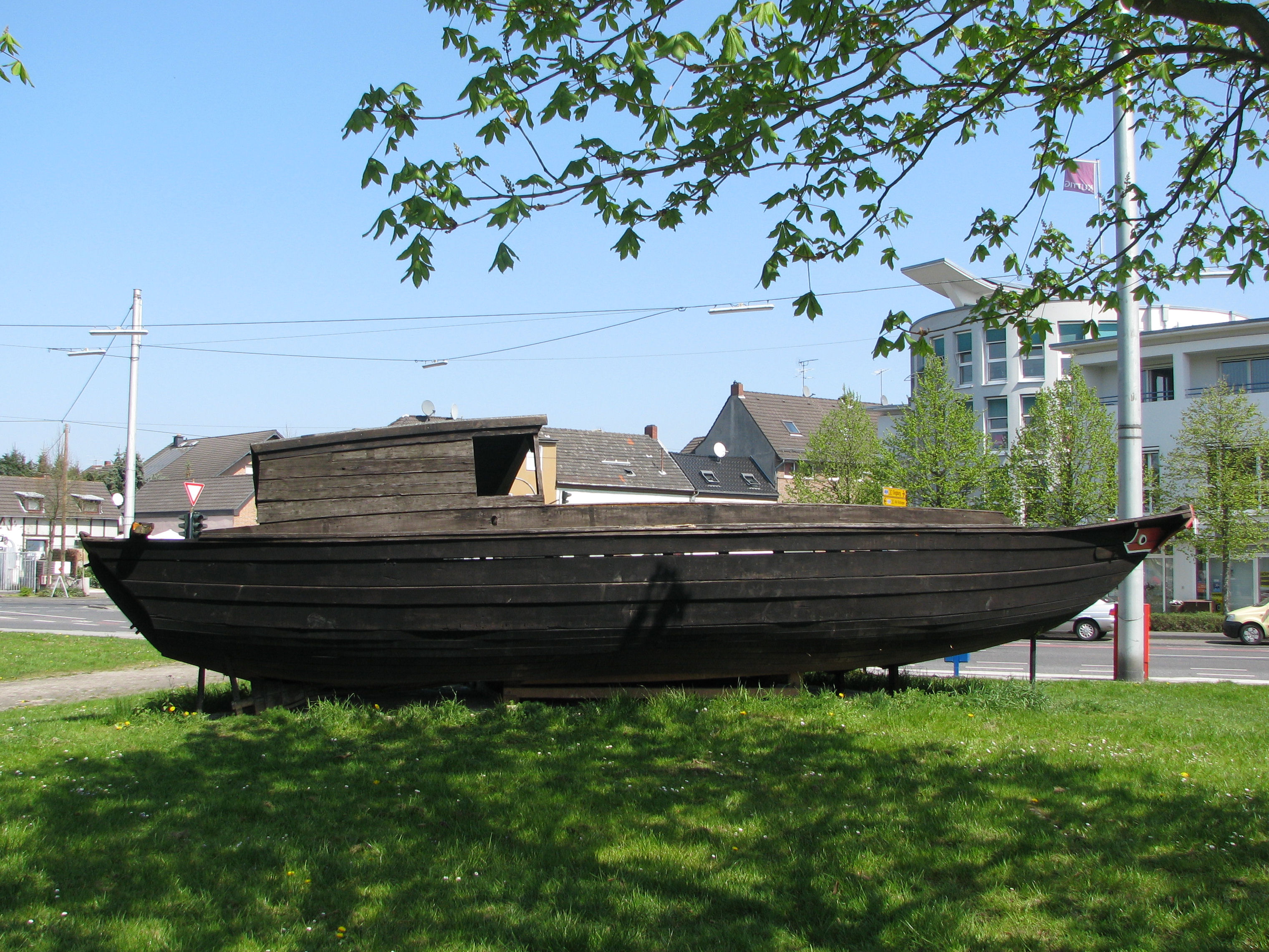
Escape boat saved by Cap Anamur in late April 1984, placed in Troisdorf

Between 1980 and 1986, the outflow of boat people from Vietnam was less than the numbers resettled in other countries. In 1987, the numbers of boat people began to grow again. The destination this time was primarily Hong Kong and Thailand. Concerning the impact on its economy, security and society, the Hong Kong government began to search for solutions. In early 1987, one of the accommodated Vietnamese refugee boats received the assistance of the Immigration Department to depart to continue sailing. It arrived in Kinmen to apply for asylum but was rejected by the ROC military, then was slaughtered on Lieyu Island on 7 March, known as the Lieyu Massacre. The boat was burnt, evidence destroyed, and the ROC Ministry of National Defense repeatedly denied on the journalists' reportages and the parliament questioning. The chilling effect made the refugee boats extinct on northbound afterwards.

On 15 June 1988, after more than 18,000 Vietnamese had arrived that year, Hong Kong authorities announced that all new arrivals would be placed in detention centres and confined until they could be resettled. Boat people were held in prison-like conditions and education and other programs were eliminated. Countries in Southeast Asia were equally negative about accepting newly arriving Vietnamese boat people into their countries. Moreover, both asylum and resettlement countries were doubtful that many of the newer boat people were fleeing political repression and thus merited refugee status.

Another international refugee conference in Geneva in June 1989 produced the Comprehensive Plan of Action (CPA) which had the aim of reducing the migration of boat people by requiring that all new arrivals be screened to determine if they were genuine refugees. Those who failed to qualify as refugees would be repatriated, voluntarily or involuntarily, to Vietnam, a process that would take more than a decade. The CPA quickly served to reduce boat people migration.

In 1989, about 70,000 Indochinese boat people arrived in five Southeast Asian countries and Hong Kong. By 1992, that number declined to only 41 and the era of the Vietnamese Boat People fleeing their homeland definitively ended. However, resettlement of Vietnamese continued under the Orderly Departure Program, especially of former re-education camp inmates, Amerasian children, and to reunify families.

== Resettlement and repatriation ==
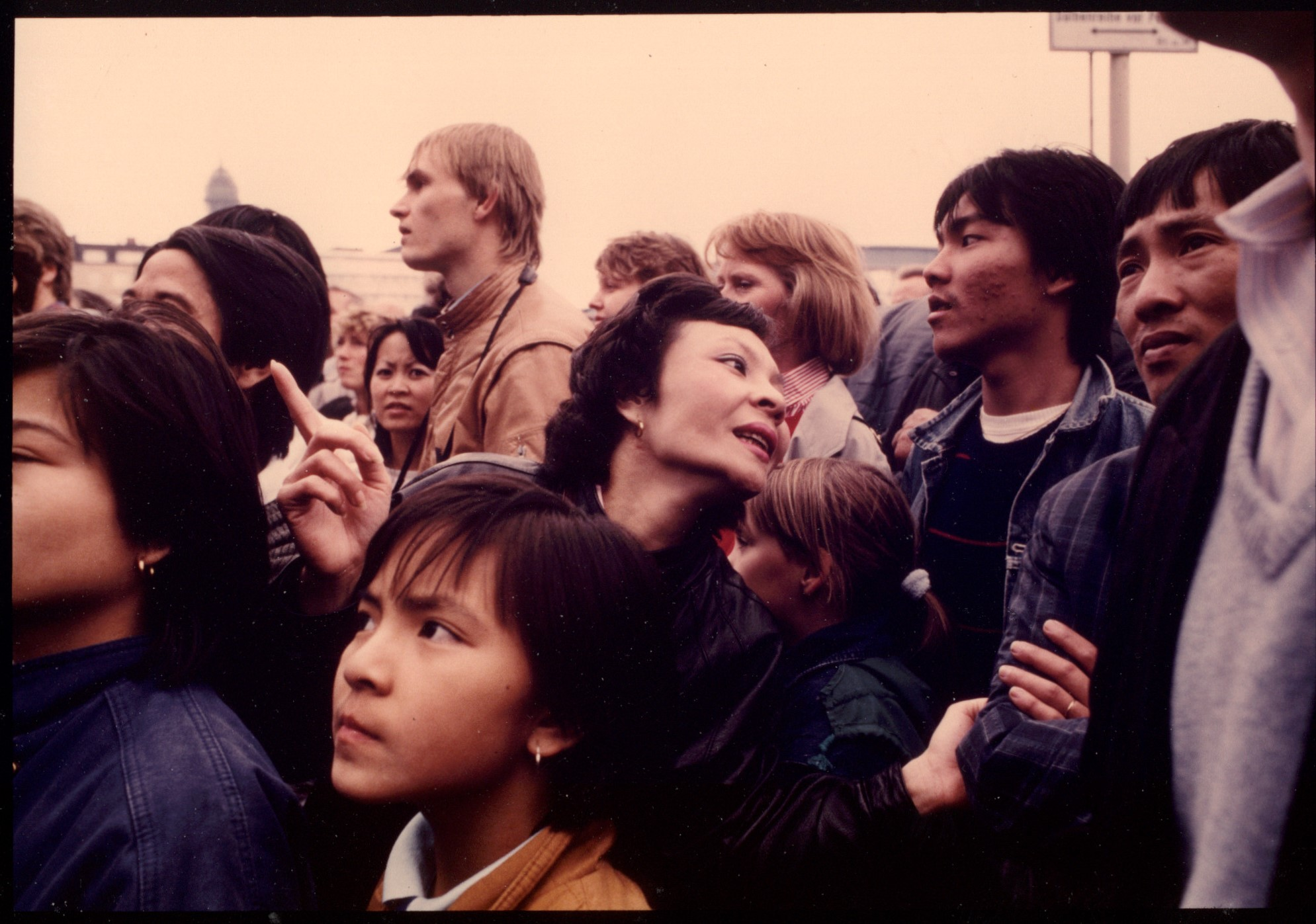
Greeting Vietnamese refugees from the rescue ship Cap Anamur II in 1986

The boat people comprised only part of the Vietnamese resettled abroad from 1975 until the end of the twentieth century. A total of more than 1.2 million Vietnamese were resettled between 1975 and 1997. Of that number more than 700,000 were boat people; the remaining 900,000 were resettled under the Orderly Departure Program or in China or Malaysia. (For complete statistics see Indochina refugee crisis).

UNHCR statistics for 1975 to 1997 indicate that 839,228 Vietnamese arrived in UNHCR camps in Southeast Asia and Hong Kong. They arrived mostly by boat, although 42,918 of the total arrived by land in Thailand. 749,929 were resettled abroad. 109,322 were repatriated, either voluntarily or involuntarily. The residual caseload of Vietnamese boat people in 1997 was 2,288, of whom 2,069 were in Hong Kong. The four countries resettling most Vietnamese boat people and land arrivals were the United States with 402,382; France with 120,403; Australia with 108,808; and Canada with 100,012.

The Orderly Departure Program from 1979 until 1994 helped to resettle refugees in the United States and other Western countries. In this program, refugees were asked to go back to Vietnam and wait for assessment. If they were deemed to be eligible to be resettled in the United States (according to criteria that the US government had established), they would be allowed to emigrate.

Humanitarian Program for Former Political Detainees, popularly called Humanitarian Operation or HO due to the "H" subgroup designation within the ODP and trailing numbers 01-09 (e.g., H01-H09, H10, etc.), was set up to benefit former South Vietnamese who were involved in the former regime or worked for the United States. They were to be allowed to immigrate to the U.S. if they had suffered persecution by the communist regime after 1975.

Hong Kong adopted the "port of first asylum policy" in July 1979 and received over 100,000 Vietnamese at the peak of migration in the late 1980s. Many refugee camps were set up in its territories. Frequent violent clashes between the boat people and security forces caused public outcry and mounting concerns in the early 1990s since many camps were very close to high-density residential areas.

As hundreds of thousands of people were escaping out of Vietnam, Laos, and Cambodia via land or boat, countries of first arrival in Southeast Asia were faced with the continuing exodus and the increasing reluctance by third countries to maintain resettlement opportunities for every exile. The countries threatened push-backs of the asylum seekers. In this crisis, the Comprehensive Plan of Action For Indochinese Refugees was adopted in June 1989. The cut-off date for refugees was 14 March 1989. Effective from this day, the Indochinese Boat people would no longer automatically be considered as prima facie refugees, but only asylum seekers and would have to be screened to qualify for refugee status. Those who were "screened-out" would be sent back to Vietnam and Laos, under an orderly and monitored repatriation program.

The refugees faced prospects of staying years in the camps and ultimate repatriation to Vietnam. They were branded, rightly or wrongly, as economic refugees. By the mid-1990s, the number of refugees fleeing from Vietnam had significantly dwindled. Many refugee camps were shut down. Most of the well educated or those with genuine refugee status had already been accepted by receiving countries.

The market reforms of Vietnam, the imminent handover of Hong Kong to the People's Republic of China by Britain scheduled for July 1997, and the financial incentives for voluntary return to Vietnam caused many boat people to return to Vietnam during the 1990s. Most remaining asylum seekers were voluntarily or forcibly repatriated to Vietnam, although a small number (about 2,500) were granted the right of abode by the Hong Kong Government in 2002. In 2008, the remaining refugees in the Philippines (around 200) were granted asylum in Canada, Norway, and the United States, marking an end to the history of the boat people from Vietnam.

== Memorials ==
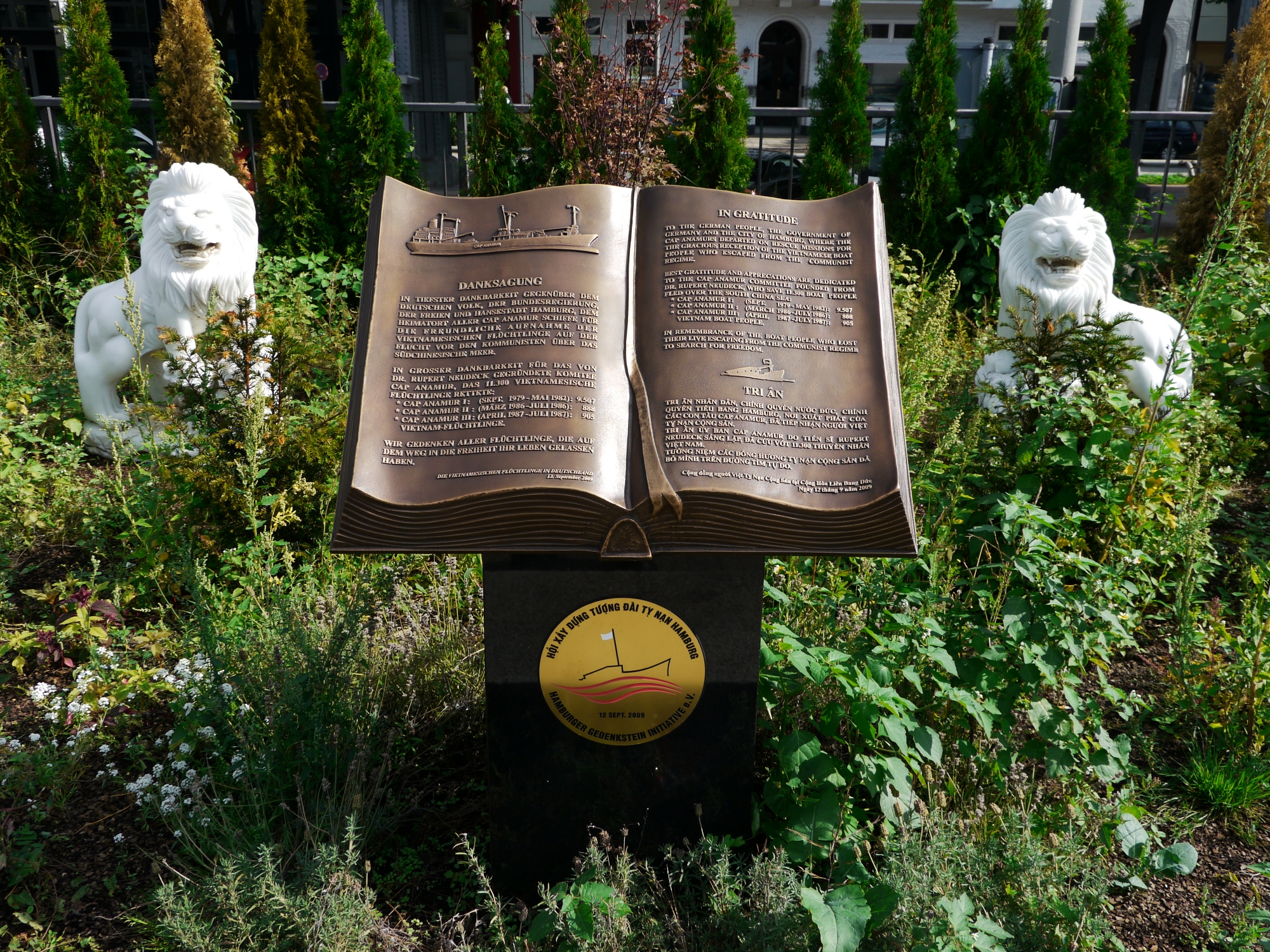
Bronze plaque in the Port of Hamburg, Germany, dedicated by Vietnamese refugees to Rupert Neudeck and the rescue ship Cap Anamur

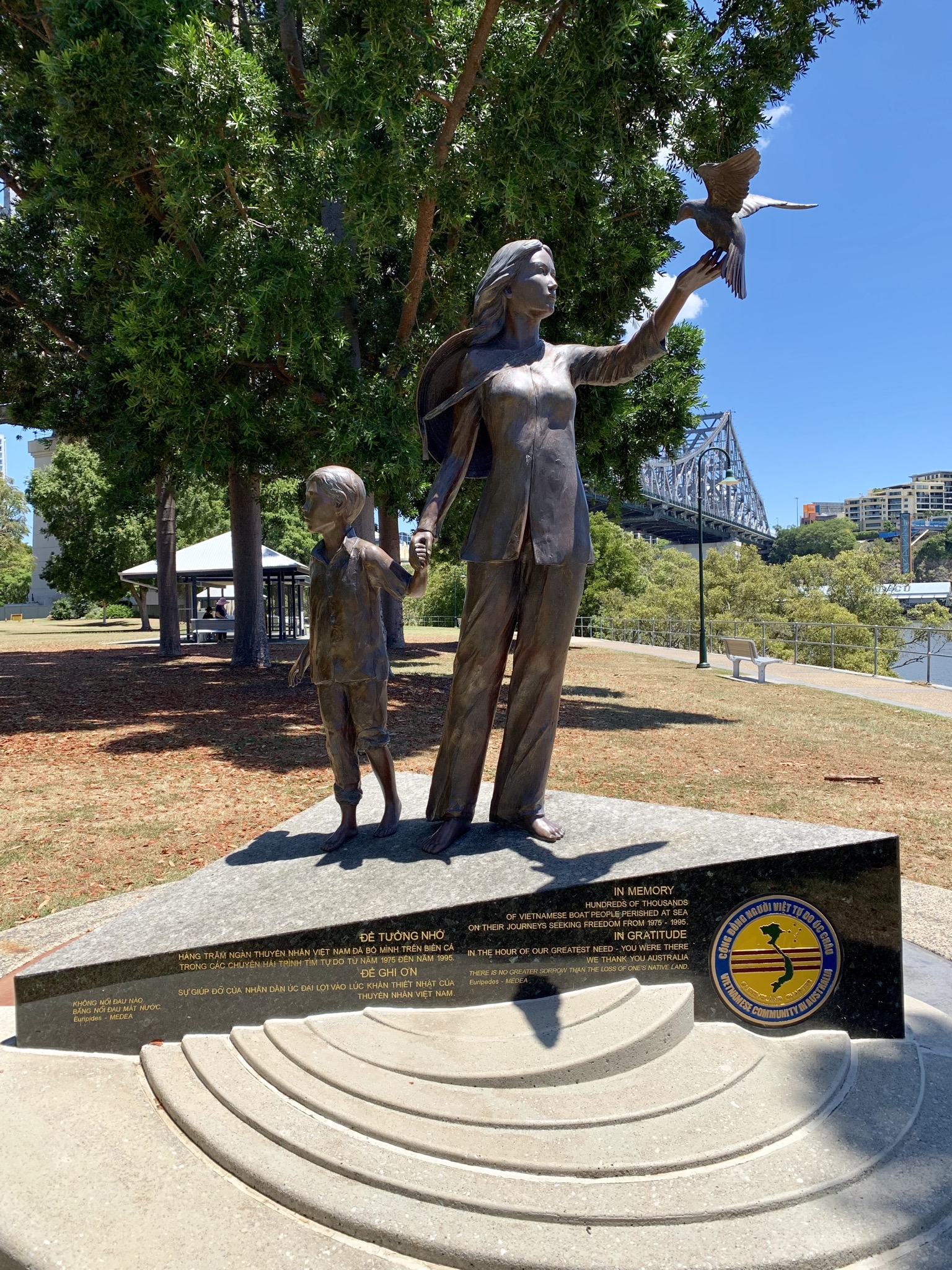
South Vietnamese Boat People Memorial in Brisbane, Australia

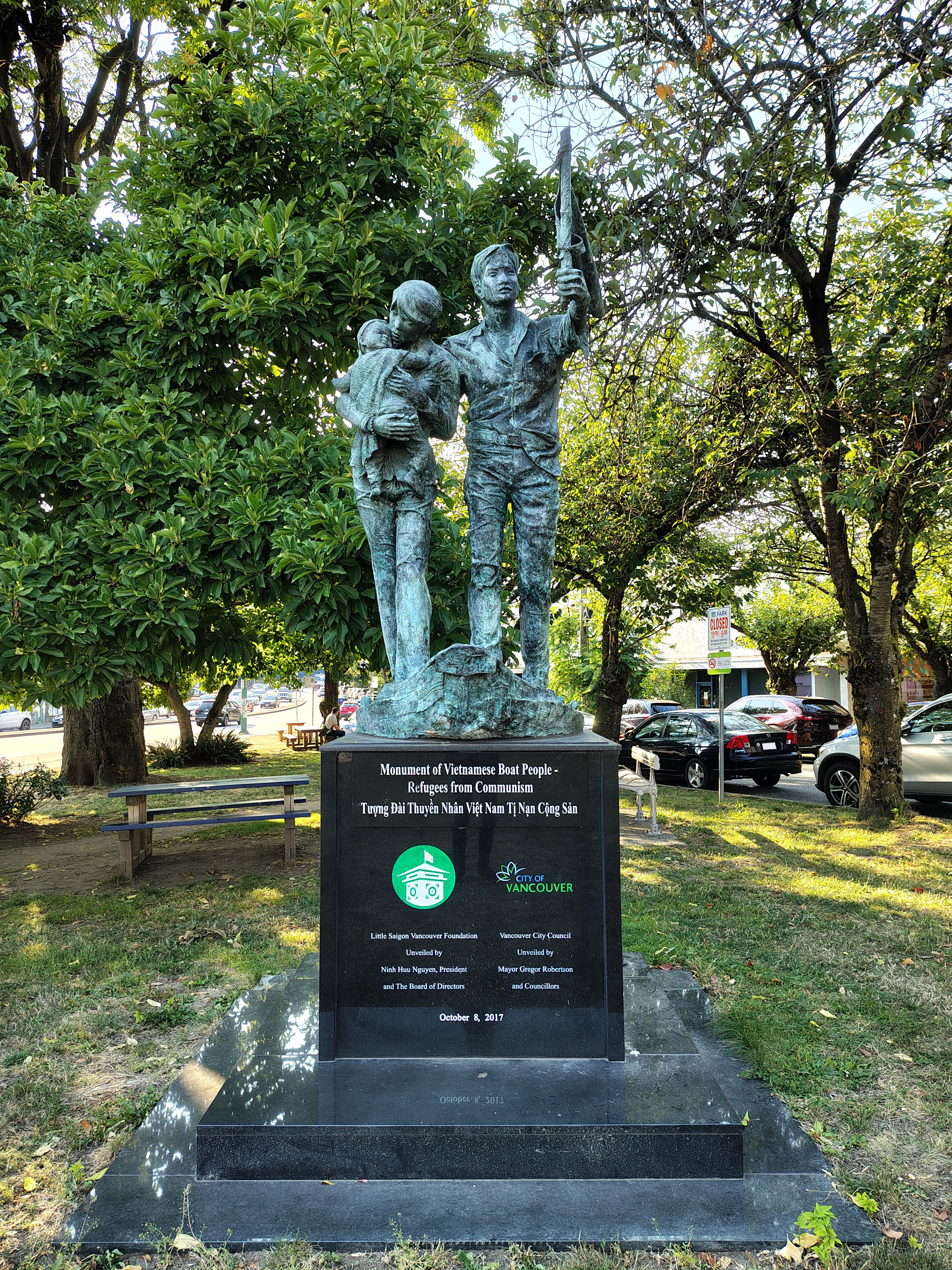
The Monument of Vietnamese Boat People in Vancouver, Canada

Some monuments and memorials were erected to commemorate the dangers and the people, who died on the journey to escape from Vietnam. Among them are:

- Ottawa, Canada (1995): "Refugee Mother and Child" Monument, Preston Street at Somerset.
- Grand-Saconnex, Switzerland (February 2006).
- Santa Ana, California, United States (February 2006).
- Liège, Belgium (July 2006).
- Hamburg, Germany (October 2006).
- Troisdorf, North Rhine-Westphalia, Germany (May 2007) (tháng 5, 2007)
- Footscray, Victoria, Australia (June 2008): Jensen Park Reserve of Melbourne
- Bagneux, Hauts-de-Seine, France (11 May 2008).
- Westminster, California, United States (April 2009), by ViVi Vo Hung Kiet.
- Port Landungsbruecken, Hamburg, Germany (September 2009).
- Galang Island, Indonesia (demolished)
- Bidong Island, Malaysia
- Washington, D.C., United States
- Geneva, Switzerland
- Marne-la-Vallée, France: Roundabout "Rond Point Saigon"; André Malraux intersection avenue and boulevard des Genets of Bussy-Saint-Georges commune (12 September 2010)., statue by sculptor Vũ Đình Lâm.
- Bankstown, New South Wales, Australia (November 2011) at Saigon Place. Bronze statue, weighing more than three tons by sculptor Terrence Plowright, located in the suburb of Sydney.
- Tarempa in Anambas, Indonesia.
- Brisbane, Australia (2 December 2012) by Phillip Piperides.
- Perth, Western Australia (1 November 2013) in Wade Street Park Reserve. 5.5 meter high monument of sculptor Coral Lowry.
- Montreal, Quebec, Canada (18 November 2015) by UniAction. Courage & Inspiration is the commemorative and collective artwork of 14'L x4'H highlighting the 40th anniversary of Vietnamese Boat people refugees in Canada. It has been inaugurated and displayed at the Montreal City Hall, hosted by Frantz Benjamin, City Council President and Thi Be Nguyen, Founder of UniAction, from 18 to 28 November 2015.
- Almere, Flevoland, Netherlands (30 April 2016) by the Cộng Đồng Việt Nam Tỵ Nạn Cộng Sản Tại Hòa Lan (Associatie Van Vietnamese Vluchtelingen In Nederland). The Monument for Vietnamese boat refugees (Dutch: Monument voor Vietnamese bootvluchtelingen; Vietnamese: Tượng Đài Thuyền Nhân Việt Nam tại Hòa Lan) started construction in 2012 and was inaugurated by Franc Weerwind, the mayor of Almere, on 30 April 2016 at the Vạn Hạnh Pagoda, a local Buddhist temple.
- Vancouver, British Columbia, Canada: The Monument of Vietnamese Boat People, or the Vietnamese Boat People Memorial, by Vivi Vo Hung Kiet, dedicated on 8 October 2017 in McAuley Park.
- Des Moines, Iowa, United States. The Robert D Ray Asian Gardens is a pagoda and garden erected along the banks of the Des Moines River. Paid for in part by the thousands of Tai Dam refugees living in Iowa, the garden memorializes Governor Ray being the first elected official in the US to advocate for their resettlement.
- Adelaide (February 2021): "Vietnamese Boat People Monument."

== In popular culture ==
- Postcards from Nam (published by AmazonEncore/Lake Union in 2011) is a novel by Uyen Nicole Duong describing the search of a boat person by his successful Vietnamese immigrant lawyer friend.
- Boat People is a 1982 Hong Kong film based on research on Vietnamese refugees.
- Turtle Beach is a 1992 Australian film about raising awareness for the plight of the boat people.
- The Beautiful Country is a 2004 film about Vietnamese refugees and their journey to the US.
- Journey from the Fall is a 2005 independent film by Ham Tran, about the Vietnamese re-education camp and boat people experience following the Fall of Saigon.
- Ru is a 2009 novel by Kim Thúy on the life of a Vietnamese woman who leaves Saigon as a boat person and eventually immigrates to Quebec.
- "Plus près des étoiles" is a French song by Gold that describes the departure of the boat people from Vietnam.
- "Chicken Farm" is a Dead Kennedys song from their third album, Frankenchrist, detailing the dangers of post-war Vietnam and fleeing, and the racism the boat people faced upon arriving in the USA.
- The main setting of the manga Black Lagoon and its anime adaptation is the fictional Thai city of Roanapur, which is described as being home to many boat people who fled Vietnam.

== See also ==
- Arab Winter and the boat people
- Bắt đầu từ nay, a Vietnamese radio PSA announcing the policy of Comprehensive Plan of Action on Vietnamese boat people
- Mariel boatlift
- Mass killings under communist regimes
- Penghu Refugee Camp
- Vietnamese refugees in Israel
- Wet feet, dry feet policy

== Bibliography ==
- Chang, Pao-min (1999). "Corruption and Crime in China: Old Problems and New Trends". The Journal of East Asian Affairs. 13 (1). Institute for National Security Strategy: 221–268. JSTOR 23257220.
- Elleman, Bruce A. "The Looting and Rape of Vietnamese Boat People". Essay. In Piracy and Maritime Crime: Historical and Modern Case Studies, 97–108. Newport, Rhode Island: Naval War College Press, 2010.
- Martin Tsamenyi, The Vietnamese boat people and international law, Nathan: Griffith University, 1981
- Steve Roberts From Every End of This Earth: 13 Families and the New Lives They Made in America (novel, a.o. on Vietnamese family), 2009.
- Georges Claude Guilbert Après Hanoï: Les mémoires brouillés d'une princesse vietnamienne (novel, on Vietnamese woman and her boat people family), 2011.
- Thompson, Larry Clinton, Refugee Workers in the Indochina Exodus, Jefferson, North Carolina: MacFarland Publishing Company, 2010.
- Kim Thúy Ru, 2009
- Zhou, Min and Carl L. Bankston III Growing Up American: How Vietnamese Children Adapt to Life in the United States New York: Russell Sage Foundation, 1998.ISBN 978-0-87154-995-2.
