= Independent School Batam =

Location
- Complex Rosedale Blok E 123-124; Batam, Riau Islands, 24893; Indonesia
- Coordinates: 1°07′32″N 104°02′00″E

Information
- Principal: Mrs. Ramdani Chancellor
- Grades: Kindergarten to 10th grade/First grade Senior High School
- Campus type: Housing Estate
- Colors: Blue, white, Black
- Website: internationalschoolbatam.com

Independent School Batam is an international school located in Batam, Indonesia. It has pre-school, kindergarten, primary school, junior high school and senior high school. The school uses British International Curriculum and teaches students of various nationalities. The school was previously known as International School Batam.
