= History of Malaysia =

The Gombak River in Kuala Lumpur in 1900

Malaysia is a modern concept, created in the second half of the 20th century. However, contemporary Malaysia regards the entire history of Malaya and Borneo, spanning thousands of years back to prehistoric times, as its own history. Significant events in Malaysia's modern history include the formation of the federation, the separation of Singapore, the racial riots, Mahathir Mohamad's era of modernisation, and the nation's political upheavals of the late 20th and early 21st centuries.

The first evidence of archaic human occupation in the region dates back at least 1.83 million years, while the earliest remnants of anatomically modern humans are approximately 40,000 years old. The ancestors of the present-day population of Malaysia entered the area in multiple waves during prehistoric and historical times.

Hinduism and Buddhism from India and China dominated early regional history, reaching their peak from the 7th to the 13th centuries during the reign of the Sumatra-based Srivijaya civilisation. Islam made its initial presence in the Malay Peninsula as early as the 10th century, but it was during the 15th century that the religion firmly took root, at least among the court elites, leading to the rise of several sultanates, the most prominent being the Sultanate of Malacca and the Sultanate of Brunei.

The Portuguese were the first European colonial power to establish themselves on the Malay Peninsula and in Southeast Asia, capturing Malacca in 1511. This event led to the establishment of several sultanates, such as Johor and Perak. Dutch hegemony over the Malay sultanates increased during the 17th to 18th centuries, with the Dutch capturing Malacca in 1641 with the aid of Johor. In the 19th century, the English ultimately gained hegemony across the territory that is now Malaysia. The Anglo-Dutch Treaty of 1824 defined the boundaries between British Malaya and the Dutch East Indies (which became Indonesia), and the Anglo-Siamese Treaty of 1909 defined the boundaries between British Malaya and Siam (which became Thailand). The fourth phase of foreign influence was marked by a wave of immigration of Chinese and Indian workers to meet the needs created by the colonial economy in the Malay Peninsula and Borneo.

The Japanese invasion during World War II ended British rule in Malaya. After the Japanese Empire was defeated by the Allies, the Malayan Union was established in 1946 and reorganized as the Federation of Malaya in 1948. In the peninsula, the Malayan Communist Party (MCP) took up arms against the British, leading to the declaration of emergency rule from 1948 to 1960. A forceful military response to the communist insurgency, followed by the Baling Talks in 1955, led to Malayan independence on August 31, 1957, through diplomatic negotiation with the British. On 16 September 1963, the Federation of Malaysia was formed, but in August 1965, Singapore was expelled from the federation and became a separate independent country. A racial riot in 1969 resulted in the imposition of emergency rule, the suspension of parliament, and the proclamation of the Rukun Negara, a national philosophy promoting unity among citizens. The New Economic Policy (NEP), adopted in 1971, sought to eradicate poverty and restructure society to eliminate the identification of race with economic function.

Under Prime Minister Mahathir Mohamad, Malaysia experienced rapid economic growth and urbanization beginning in the 1980s. The National Development Policy (NDP), succeeding the previous economic policy, was implemented from 1991 to 2000. The 1997 Asian financial crisis nearly caused the country's currency, stock, and property markets to collapse, though they subsequently recovered. The 1MDB scandal came to prominence in 2015 as a significant global corruption scandal, implicating then-Prime Minister Najib Razak. The scandal significantly influenced the 2018 general election, resulting in the first change of ruling political party since independence. In early 2020, Malaysia faced a political crisis, concurrent with the COVID-19 pandemic, leading to political, health, social, and economic disruptions. The 2022 general election resulted in Malaysia's first hung parliament, leading to Anwar Ibrahim's appointment as Prime Minister on November 24, 2022.

== Prehistory ==
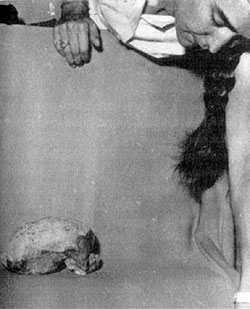
The discovery of a skull estimated to be around 40,000 years old in the Niah Caves, in Sarawak, has been identified as the earliest evidence for human settlement in Malaysian Borneo (photo December 1958).

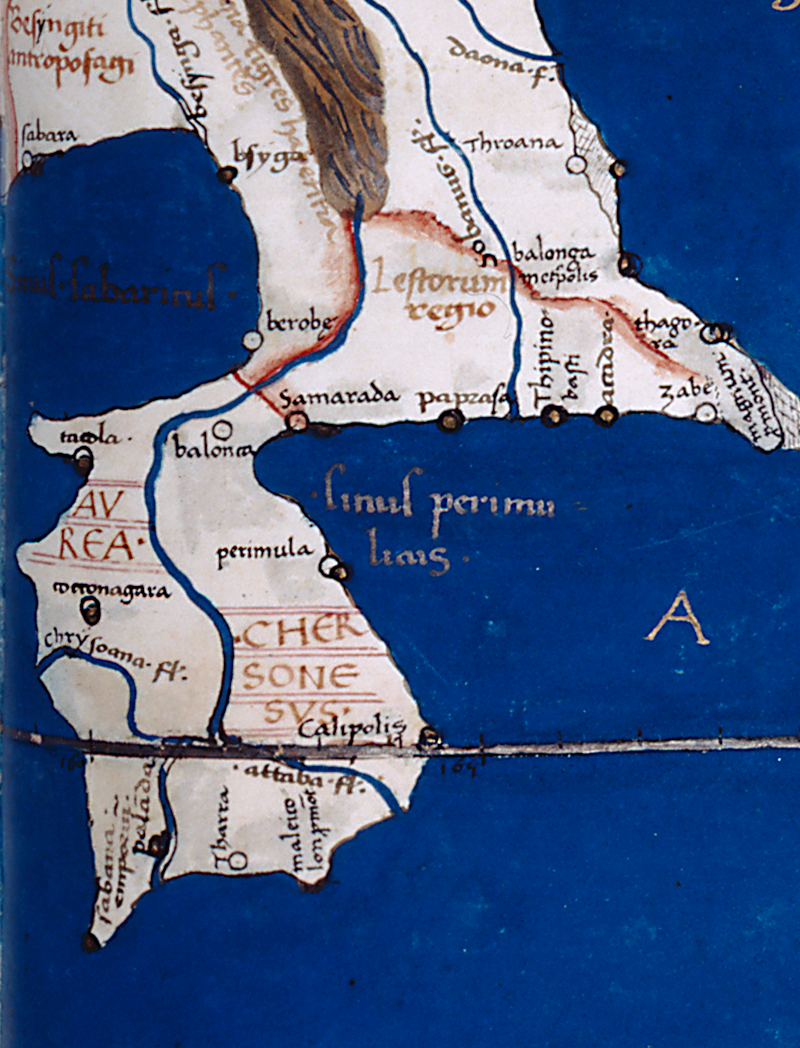
The Malay Peninsula, shown in the Ptolemy's map as the Golden Khersonese

Stone hand axes from early hominids, probably Homo erectus, have been unearthed in Lenggong. These axes date back 1.83 million years, making them some of the oldest evidence of hominid habitation in Southeast Asia.

The earliest evidence of modern human habitation in Malaysia is a 40,000-year-old skull excavated from the Niah Caves in present-day Sarawak. This skull is also one of the oldest modern human remains found in Southeast Asia. The first foragers visited the West Mouth of the Niah Caves, located 110 kilometers (68 miles) southwest of Miri, 40,000 years ago when Borneo was connected to the mainland of Southeast Asia. Mesolithic and Neolithic burial sites have also been discovered in the area. The region around the Niah Caves has been designated as Niah National Park.

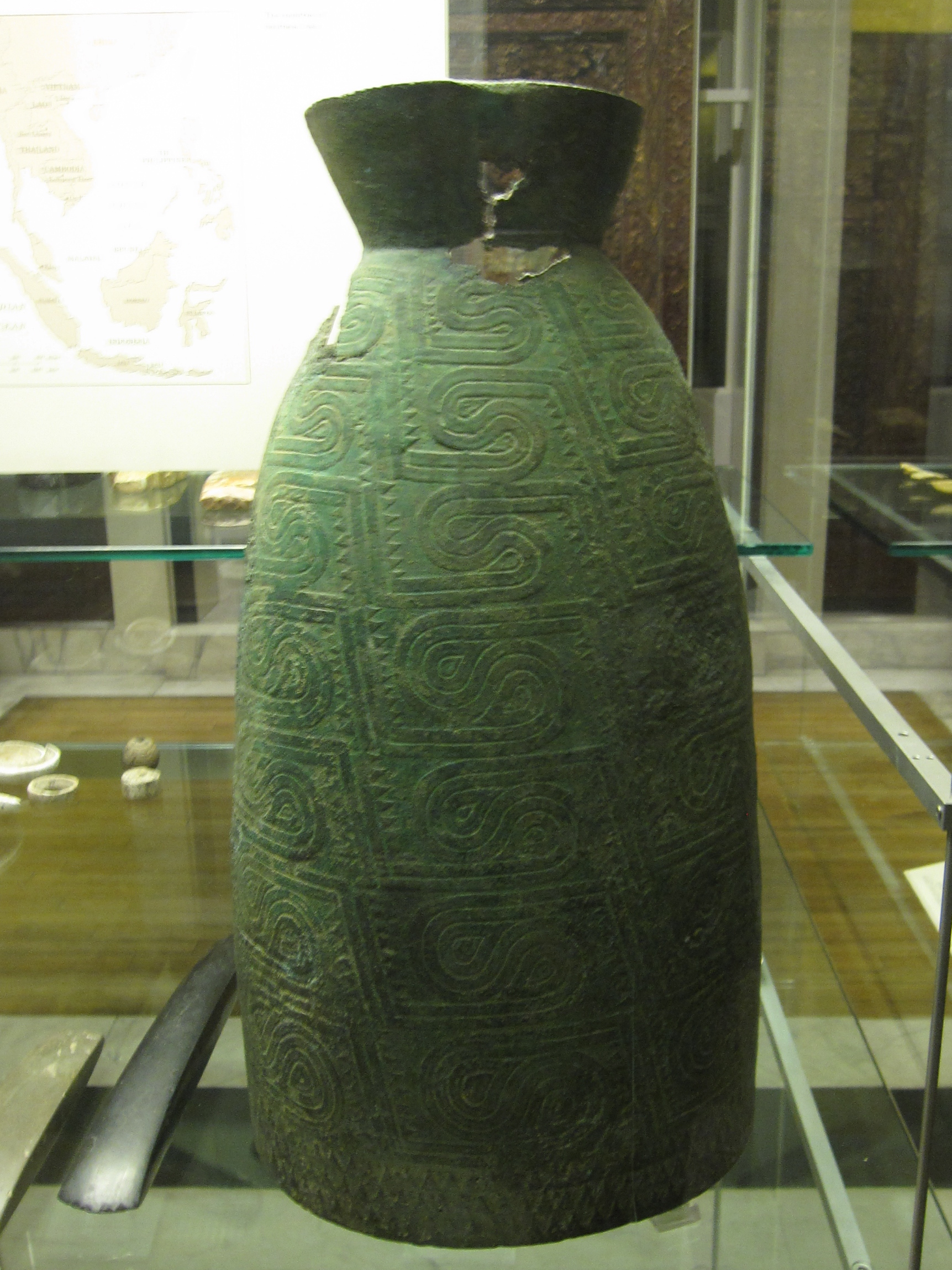
The Klang Bell, dated 200 BC–200 AD

A study of Asian genetics suggests that the original humans in East Asia came from Southeast Asia. The oldest complete skeleton found in Malaysia is the 11,000-year-old Perak Man, unearthed in 1991. Indigenous groups on the peninsula (known as the Orang Asli) can be divided into three ethnicities: the Negritos, the Senoi, and the Proto-Malays. The first inhabitants of the Malay Peninsula were most likely Negritos. These Mesolithic hunters were probably the ancestors of the Semang, an ethnic Negrito group. The Semang populations on the coast died out in the 20th century but there are still groups living in the interior of the Peninsula.

The Senoi appear to be a composite group, with approximately half of their maternal mitochondrial DNA lineages tracing back to the ancestors of the Semang and about half to later ancestral migrations from Indochina. Scholars suggest they are descendants of early Austroasiatic-speaking agriculturalists, who brought both their language and technology to the southern part of the peninsula approximately 4,000 years ago. They eventually united and coalesced with the indigenous population.

The Proto-Malays have a more diverse origin and had settled in Malaysia by 1000 BC as a result of Austronesian expansion. Although they show some connections with other inhabitants of Maritime Southeast Asia, some also have ancestry in Indochina around the time of the Last Glacial Maximum, about 20,000 years ago. Areas comprising what is now Malaysia participated in the Maritime Jade Road, a trading network that existed for 3,000 years, between 2000 BC and 1000 AD.

Anthropologists support the notion that the Proto-Malays originated from what is today Yunnan, China. This was followed by an early-Holocene dispersal through the Malay Peninsula into the Malay Archipelago. Around 300 BC, they were pushed inland by the Deutero-Malays, an Iron Age or Bronze Age people descended partly from the Chams of Cambodia and Vietnam. The Deutero-Malays, the first group in the peninsula to use metal tools, were direct ancestors of modern Malaysian Malays and introduced advanced farming techniques. The Malays remained politically fragmented throughout the Malay Archipelago, although they shared a common culture and social structure.

== Early Hindu-Buddhist kingdoms ==
Historic Indosphere cultural influence zone of Greater India for transmission of religion, music, arts, and cuisine

In the first millennium AD, the Malay became the dominant ethnicity on the peninsula. The small early states that were established were greatly influenced by Indian culture, as was most of Southeast Asia. Indian influence in the region dates back to at least the 3rd century BC. South Indian culture was spread to Southeast Asia by the South Indian Pallava dynasty in the 4th and 5th centuries.

=== Trade with India and China ===
In ancient Indian literature, the term Suvarnadvipa (Golden Peninsula) is used in the Ramayana; some argue that this is a reference to the Malay Peninsula. The ancient Indian text Vayu Purana also mentions a place named Malayadvipa; this term may refer to Sumatra and the Malay Peninsula. The Malay Peninsula was shown on Ptolemy's map as the Golden Chersonese.

Trade relations with China and India were established in the 1st century BC. Shards of Chinese pottery have been found in Borneo dating from the 1st century following the southward expansion of the Han dynasty. In the early centuries of the first millennium, the people of the Malay Peninsula adopted the Indian religions of Hinduism and Buddhism, which had a major effect on the language and culture of those living in Malaysia. The Sanskrit writing system was used as early as the 4th century.

=== Early kingdoms (3rd–7th centuries) ===
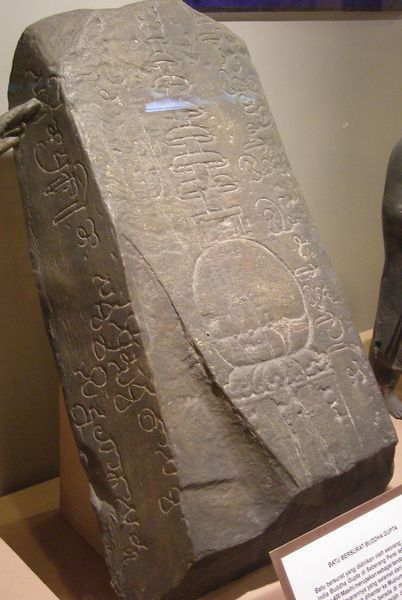
The Buddha-Gupta stone, dating to the 4th–5th century AD, was dedicated by an Indian Merchant, Buddha Gupta. Found in Seberang Perai and kept in the National Museum, Calcutta, India.

There were as many as 30 Malay kingdoms in the 2nd and 3rd centuries, mainly based on the eastern side of the Malay Peninsula. Among the earliest kingdoms known to have been based in the Malay Peninsula was the ancient kingdom of Langkasuka, located in the northern Malay Peninsula and based somewhere on the east coast. It was closely tied to Funan in Cambodia, which also ruled parts of northern Malaysia until the 6th century. In the 5th century, the Kingdom of Pahang was mentioned in the Book of Song. Besides this, Chi Tu and Pan Pan were old polities believed to be located in the northeast of the peninsula.

==== Gangga Negara ====
Gangga Negara was a semi-legendary Hindu kingdom mentioned in the Malay Annals that covered present-day Beruas, Dinding and Manjung in the state of Perak, Malaysia with Raja Gangga Shah Johan as one of its kings. According to the legendary Hikayat Merong Mahawangsa, Gangga Negara was founded by Merong Mahawangsa's son Raja Ganji Sarjuna of Kedah, allegedly a descendant of Alexander the Great or by the Khmer royalty no later than the 2nd century.

==== Old Kedah ====
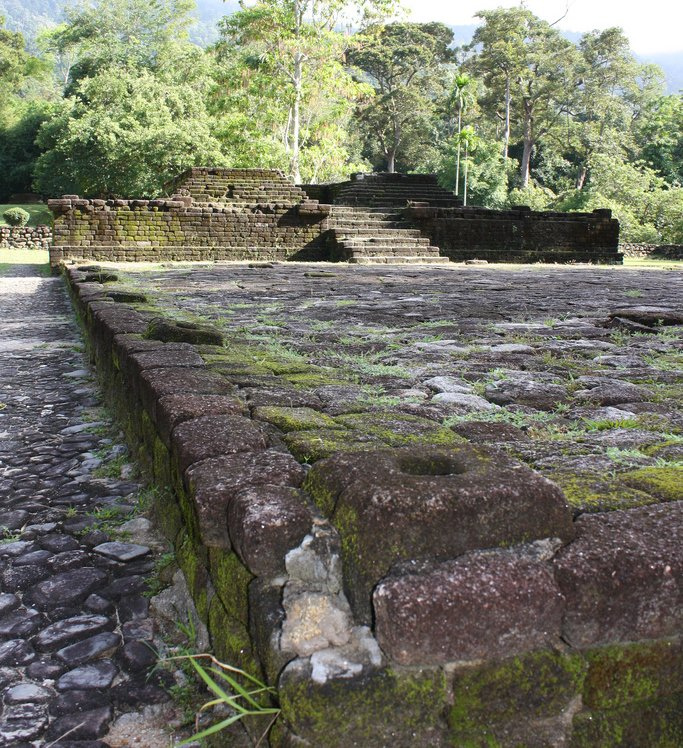
Built in the 6th century AD, Candi Bukit Batu Pahat is the most well-known ancient Hindu temple found in Bujang Valley.

Ptolemy, a Greek geographer, had written about the Golden Chersonese, which indicated that trade with India and China had existed since the 1st century AD. During this time, coastal city-states that existed had a trade network which encompassed the southern part of the Indochinese Peninsula and the western part of the Malay Archipelago. These coastal cities had ongoing trade as well as tributary relations with China, at the same time being in constant contact with Indian traders. They seem to have shared a common indigenous culture.

Gradually, the rulers of the western part of the archipelago adopted Indian cultural and political models. Three inscriptions found in Palembang (South Sumatra) and on Bangka Island, written in the form of Malay and in alphabets derived from the Pallava script, are proof that the archipelago had adopted Indian models while maintaining their indigenous language and social system. These inscriptions reveal the existence of a Dapunta Hyang (lord) of Srivijaya who led an expedition against his enemies and who curses those who does not obey his law.

Being on the maritime trade route between China and South India, the Malay Peninsula was involved in this trade. The Bujang Valley, being strategically located at the northwest entrance of the Strait of Malacca as well as facing the Bay of Bengal, was continuously frequented by Chinese and south Indian traders. Such was proven by the discovery of trade ceramics, sculptures, inscriptions and monuments dated from the 5th to 14th century.

=== Srivijaya (7th–13th century) ===
Between the 7th and the 13th century, much of the Malay Peninsula was under the influence of Srivijaya. The site Prasasti Hujung Langit, which sat at the centre of Srivijaya's empire, is thought to be at a river mouth in eastern Sumatra, based near what is now Palembang, Indonesia. In the 7th century, a new port called Shilifoshi is mentioned, believed to be a Chinese rendering of Srivijaya. For over six centuries the Maharajahs of Srivijaya ruled a maritime empire that became the main power in the archipelago. The empire was based around trade, with local kings (dhatus or community leaders) that swore allegiance to a lord for mutual profit. In 1025, the Chola dynasty captured Palembang, the king, all his family members and his courtiers had their wealth taken away; by the end of the 12th century Srivijaya had been reduced to a kingdom, with their last ruler, Queen Sekerummong being conquered and overthrown in 1288. Majapahit, a subordinate to Srivijaya, soon dominated the region's political scene.

==== Relations with the Chola Empire ====
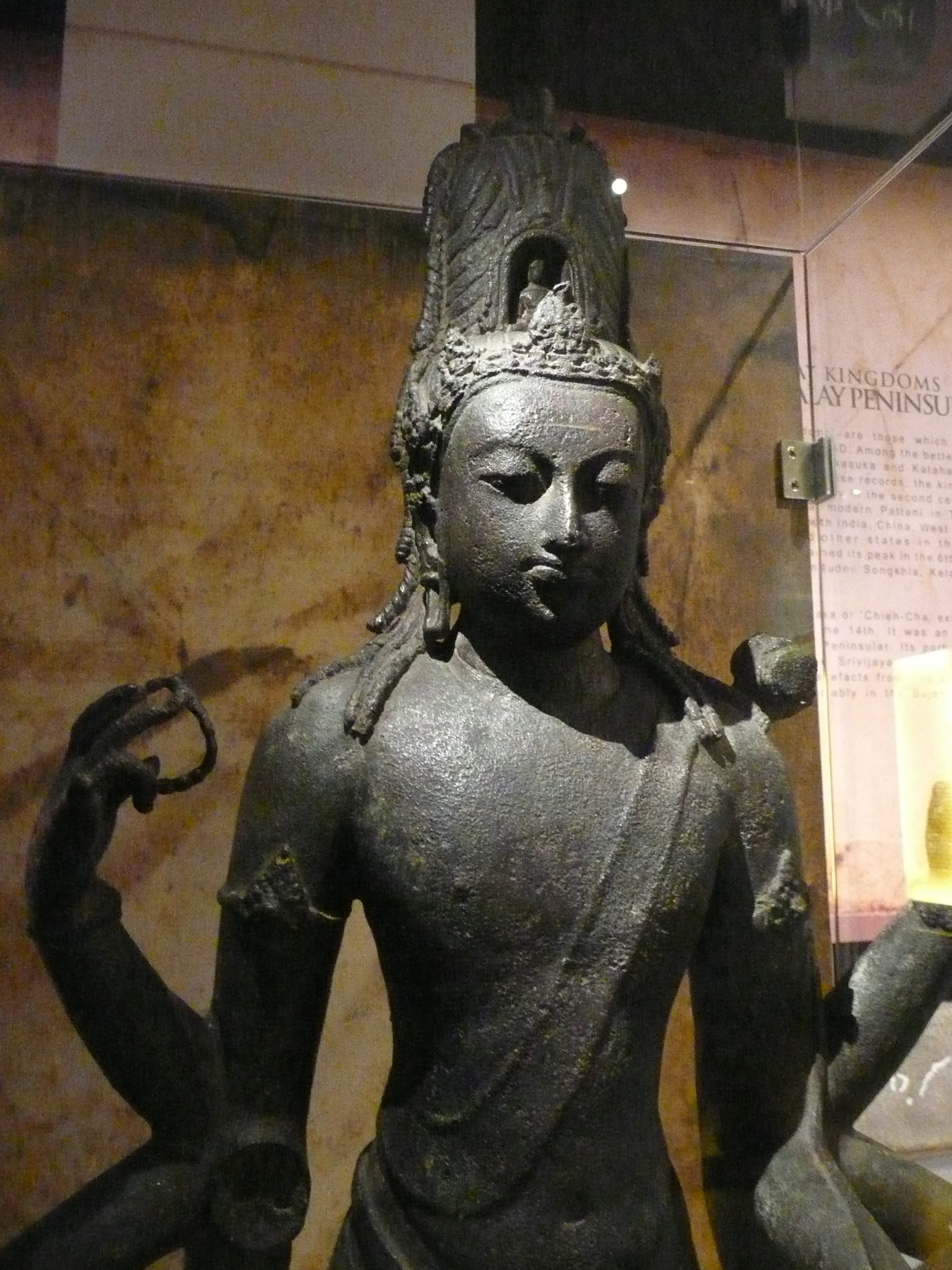
Bronze Avalokiteshvara statue found in Perak, 8th–9th century

The relation between Srivijaya and the Chola Empire of south India was friendly during the reign of Raja Raja Chola I but during the reign of Rajendra Chola I the Chola Empire invaded Srivijaya cities (see Chola invasion of Srivijaya). In 1025 and 1026, Gangga Negara was attacked by Rajendra Chola I of the Chola Empire, the Tamil emperor who is now thought to have laid Kota Gelanggi to waste. Kedah (known as Kadaram in Tamil) was invaded by the Cholas in 1025. A second invasion was led by Virarajendra Chola of the Chola dynasty who conquered Kedah in the late 11th century. The senior Chola's successor, Vira Rajendra Chola, had to put down a Kedah rebellion to overthrow other invaders. The coming of the Chola reduced the majesty of Srivijaya, which had exerted influence over Kedah, Pattani and as far as Ligor. During the reign of Kulothunga Chola I, Chola overlordship was established over the Srivijaya province Kedah in the late 11th century. The expedition of the Chola Emperors had such a great impression on the Malay people of the medieval period that their name was mentioned in the corrupted form as Raja Chulan in the medieval Malay chronicle Sejarah Melaya. Even today, the Chola rule is remembered in Malaysia as many Malaysian princes have names ending with Cholan or Chulan, one such was the Raja of Perak called Raja Chulan.

Pattinapalai, a Tamil poem of the 2nd century AD, describes goods from Kedaram heaped in the broad streets of the Chola capital. The Buddhist kingdom of Ligor took control of Kedah shortly after. Its king Chandrabhanu used it as a base to attack Sri Lanka in the 11th century and ruled the northern parts, an event noted in a stone inscription in Nagapattinum in Tamil Nadu and the Sri Lankan chronicles, Mahavamsa.

==== Decline and breakup ====
At times, the Khmer Empire, the Siamese Kingdom, and the Chola Empire had tried to exert control over the smaller Malay states. The power of Srivijaya declined from the 12th century as the relationship between the capital and its vassals broke down. Wars with the Javanese caused it to request assistance from China, and wars with Indian states are also suspected. In the 11th century, the centre of power shifted to Malayu, a port possibly located further up the Sumatran coast near the Jambi River. The power of the Buddhist Maharajas was further undermined by the spread of Islam. Areas which were converted to Islam early, such as Aceh, broke away from Srivijaya's control. By the late 13th century, the Siamese kings of Sukhothai had brought most of Malaya under their rule. In the 14th century, the Hindu Majapahit Empire came into possession of the peninsula.

An excavation by Tom Harrisson in 1949 unearthed a series of Chinese ceramics at Santubong (near Kuching) that date to the Tang and Song dynasties. It is possible that Santubong was an important seaport in Sarawak during the period, but its importance declined during the Yuan dynasty, and the port was deserted during the Ming dynasty.

According to the Malay Annals, a new ruler named Sang Sapurba was promoted as the new paramount of the Srivijayan mandala. It was said that after he acceded to Seguntang Hill with his two younger brothers, Sang Sapurba entered into a sacred covenant with Demang Lebar Daun, the native ruler of Palembang. The newly installed sovereign afterwards descended from the hill of Seguntang into the great plain of the Musi River, where he married Wan Sendari, the daughter of the local chief, Demang Lebar Daun. Sang Sapurba was said to have reigned in Minangkabau lands.

In 1324, a Srivijaya prince, Sang Nila Utama founded the Kingdom of Singapura (Temasek). According to tradition, he was related to Sang Sapurba. He maintained control over Temasek for 48 years. He was recognized as ruler over Temasek by an envoy of the Chinese Emperor sometime around 1366. He was succeeded by his son Paduka Sri Pekerma Wira Diraja (1372–1386) and grandson, Paduka Seri Rana Wira Kerma (1386–1399). In 1401, the last ruler, Paduka Sri Maharaja Parameswara, was expelled from Temasek by forces from Majapahit or Ayutthaya. He later headed north and founded the Sultanate of Malacca in 1402. The Sultanate of Malacca succeeded the Srivijaya Empire as a Malay political entity in the archipelago.

== Rise of Muslim states ==
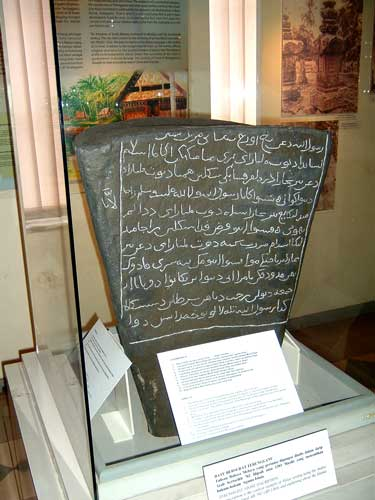
The earliest record of a local law influenced by Islamic teaching and written in Jawi. The stone monument is found in Terengganu.

Islam came to the Malay Archipelago through the Arab and Indian traders in the 13th century, ending the age of Hinduism and Buddhism. It arrived in the region gradually and became the religion of the elite before it spread to the commoners. The syncretic form of Islam in Malaysia was influenced by previous religions and was originally not orthodox.

=== Malaccan Sultanate ===
==== Establishment ====
The port of Malacca on the west coast of the Malay Peninsula was founded in 1400 by Parameswara, a Srivijayan prince fleeing Temasek (now Singapore). Parameswara sailed to Temasek to escape persecution. There he came under the protection of Temagi, a Malay chief from Patani who was appointed by the king of Siam as regent of Temasek. Within a few days, Parameswara killed Temagi and appointed himself regent. Some five years later he had to leave Temasek, due to threats from Siam. During this period, a Javanese fleet from Majapahit attacked Temasek.

Parameswara headed north to find a new settlement, reaching a fishing village at the mouth of the Bertam River (former name of the Melaka River) where he founded what would become the Malacca Sultanate. Over time this developed into modern-day Malacca Town. According to the Malay Annals, here Parameswara saw a mouse deer outwitting a dog resting under a Malacca tree. Taking this as a good omen, he decided to establish a kingdom called Malacca. He built and improved facilities for trade. The Malacca Sultanate is commonly considered the first independent state in the peninsula.

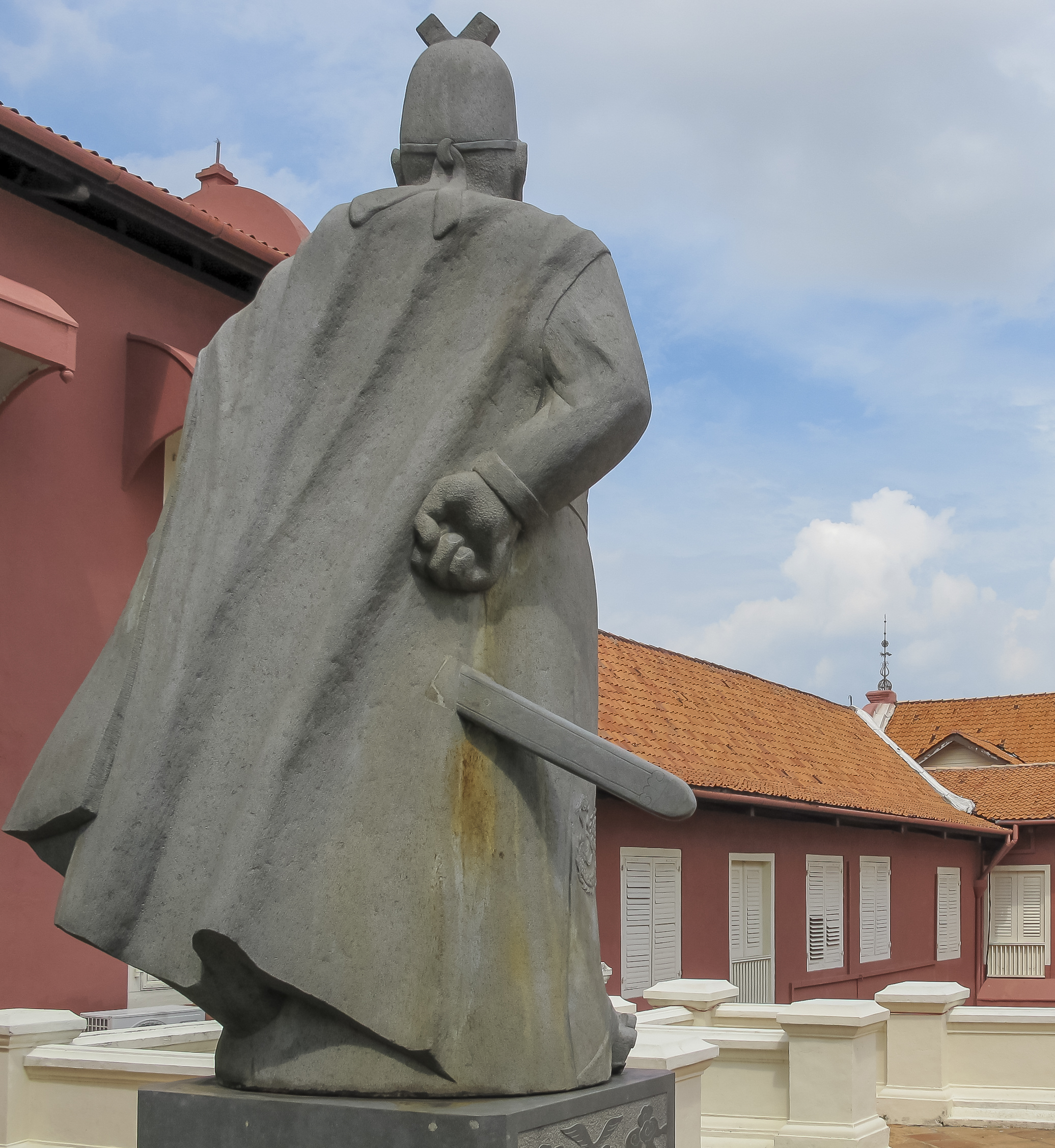
The Zheng He monument, today, marks his stopover at the city.

In 1404, the first official Chinese trade envoy led by Admiral Yin Qing arrived in Malacca. Later, Parameswara was escorted by Zheng He and other envoys on his successful visits. Malacca's relationships with Ming granted protection to Malacca against attacks from Siam and Majapahit and Malacca officially submitted as a protectorate of Ming China. This encouraged the development of Malacca into a major trade settlement on the trade route between China and India, the Middle East, Africa and Europe. To prevent the Malaccan empire from falling to the Siamese and Majapahit, he forged a relationship with Ming China for protection. Following the establishment of this relationship, the prosperity of the Malacca entrepôt was then recorded by the first Chinese visitor, Ma Huan, who travelled together with Admiral Zheng He. In Malacca during the early 15th century, Ming China actively sought to develop a commercial hub and a base of operation for their treasure voyages into the Indian Ocean. Malacca had been a relatively insignificant region, not even qualifying as a polity prior to the voyages according to both Ma Huan and Fei Xin, and was a vassal region of Siam. In 1405, the Ming court dispatched Admiral Zheng He with a stone tablet enfeoffing the Western Mountain of Malacca as well as an imperial order elevating the status of the port to a country. The Chinese also established a government depot (官廠) as a fortified cantonment for their soldiers. Ma Huan reported that Siam did not dare to invade Malacca thereafter. The rulers of Malacca, such as Parameswara in 1411, would pay tribute to the Chinese emperor in person.

The emperor of Ming China was sending out fleets of ships to expand trade. Admiral Zheng He called at Malacca and brought Parameswara with him on his return to China, a recognition of his position as ruler of Malacca. In exchange for regular tribute, the Chinese emperor offered Melaka protection from the constant threat of a Siamese attack. Because of its strategic location, Malacca was an important stopping point for Zheng He's fleet. Due to Chinese involvement, Malacca had grown as a key alternative to other important and established ports. (Note: Major ports in their respective regions included Palembang on the Malaccan Strait, Calicut on the Malabar coast, and Mombasa on the Swahili Coast) The Chinese and Indians who settled in the Malay Peninsula before and during this period are the ancestors of today's Baba-Nyonya and Chitty communities. According to one theory, Parameswara became a Muslim when he married a Princess of Pasai and he took the fashionable Persian title "Shah", calling himself Iskandar Shah. In 1414, Parameswara's son was then officially recognised as the second ruler of Melaka by the Chinese Emperor and styled Raja Sri Rama Vikrama, Raja of Parameswara of Temasek and Malacca and he was known to his Muslim subjects as Sultan Sri Iskandar Zulkarnain Shah (Megat Iskandar Shah). He ruled Malacca from 1414 to 1424. Through the influence of Indian Muslims and, to a lesser extent, Hui people from China, Islam became increasingly common during the 15th century.

==== Rise of Malacca ====
The extent of the Malaccan Empire in the 15th century became the main point for the spreading of Islam in the Malay Archipelago.

After an initial period paying tribute to the Ayutthaya, the kingdom rapidly assumed the place previously held by Srivijaya, establishing independent relations with China, and exploiting its position dominating the Straits to control the China-India maritime trade, which became increasingly important when the Mongol conquests closed the overland route between China and the west.

Within a few years of its establishment, Malacca officially adopted Islam. Parameswara became a Muslim, and because Malacca was under a Muslim prince, the conversion of Malays to Islam accelerated in the 15th century. The political power of the Malacca Sultanate helped Islam's rapid spread through the archipelago. By the start of the 16th century, with the Malacca Sultanate in the Malay Peninsula and parts of Sumatra, the Demak Sultanate in Java, and other kingdoms around the Malay Archipelago increasingly converting to Islam, it had become the dominant religion among Malays, and reached as far as the modern-day Philippines, leaving Bali as an isolated outpost of Hinduism today. The government in Malacca was based on the feudal system.

Malacca's reign lasted little more than a century, but during this time became the established centre of Malay culture. Most future Malay states originated from this period. Malacca became a cultural centre, creating the matrix of the modern Malay culture: a blend of indigenous Malay and imported Indian, Chinese and Islamic elements. Malacca's fashions in literature, art, music, dance and dress, and the ornate titles of its royal court, came to be seen as the standard for all ethnic Malays. The court of Malacca also gave great prestige to the Malay language, which had originally evolved in Sumatra and been brought to Malacca at the time of its foundation. In time Malay came to be the official language of all the Malaysian states, although local languages survived in many places. After the fall of Malacca, the Sultanate of Brunei became the major centre of Islam.

=== Post-Malaccan sultanates ===
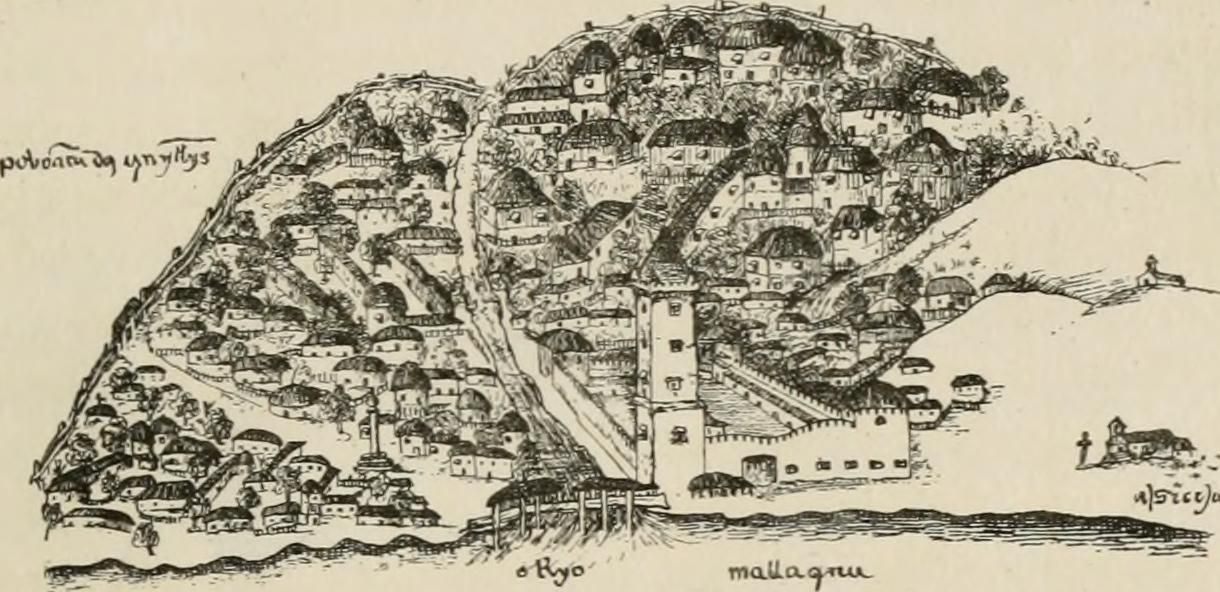
16th century Portuguese sketch of Malacca.

From the 15th century onwards, the Portuguese started seeking a maritime route to Asia. In 1511, Afonso de Albuquerque led an expedition to Malaya which seized Malacca with the intent of using it as a base for activities in Southeast Asia. This was the first colonial claim in what is now Malaysia. The son of the last Sultan of Malacca, Alauddin Riayat Shah II fled to the southern tip of the peninsula, where he founded a state that which became the Sultanate of Johor in 1528. Another son, Muzaffar Shah I established the Perak Sultanate to the north. Portuguese influence was strong, as they aggressively tried to convert the population of Malacca to Catholicism. In 1571, the Spanish captured Manila and established a colony in the Philippines, reducing the Sultanate of Brunei's power.

After the fall of Malacca to Portugal, the Johor Sultanate on the southern Malay Peninsula and the Sultanate of Aceh on northern Sumatra moved to fill the power vacuum left behind. The three powers struggled to dominate the Malay Peninsula and the surrounding islands. Meanwhile, the importance of the Strait of Malacca as an east–west shipping route was growing, while the islands of Southeast Asia were themselves prized sources of natural resources (metals, spices, etc.) whose inhabitants were being further drawn into the global economy.

In 1607, the Sultanate of Aceh rose as the most powerful and wealthiest state in the Malay Archipelago. Under Sultan Iskandar Muda's reign, the sultanate's control was extended over a number of Malay states. During the Battle of Duyon River, Iskandar Muda's disastrous campaign against Malacca in 1629, the combined Portuguese and Johor forces managed to destroy all the ships of his formidable fleet and 19,000 troops according to a Portuguese account.

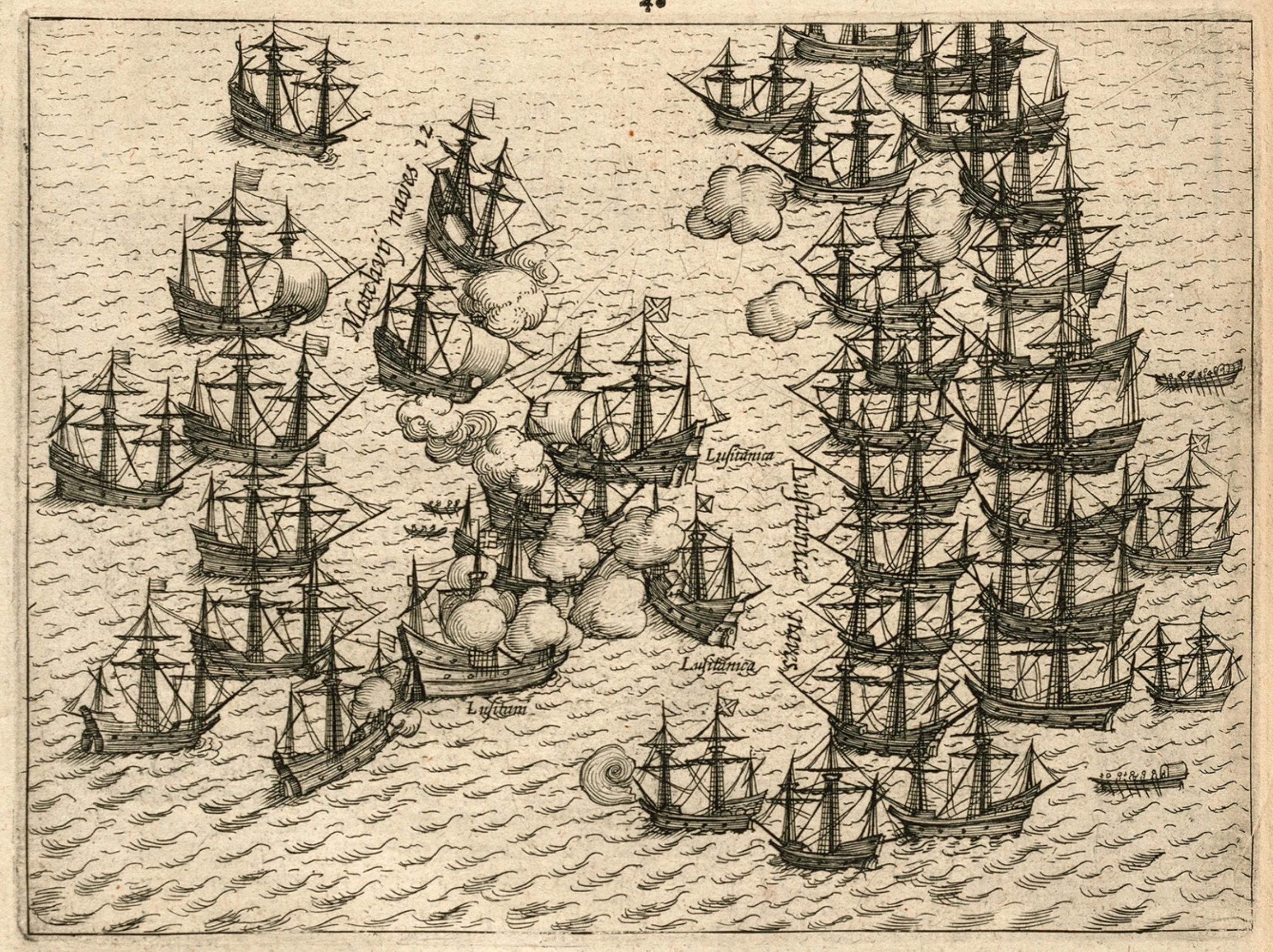
The Dutch fleet battling with the Portuguese armada as part of the Dutch–Portuguese War in 1606 to gain control of Malacca

In the early 17th century, the Dutch East India Company (Vereenigde Oost-Indische Compagnie, or VOC) was established. Backed by the Dutch, Johor established a loose hegemony over the Malay states, except Perak, which was able to play-off Johor against the Siamese to the north and retain its independence. The Dutch did not interfere in local matters in Malacca, but at the same time diverted most trade to its colonies on Java.

==== Johor Sultanate ====
At its height, the sultanate controlled modern-day Johor, several territories by the Klang and Linggi rivers, Singapore, Bintan, Riau, Lingga, Karimun, Bengkalis, Kampar and Siak in Sumatra. The Portuguese and Johor were frequently in conflict in the 16th century, most notably in the 1587 siege of Johor. During the Triangular war, Aceh launched multiple raids against both Johor and Portuguese forces to tighten its grip over the straits. The rise and expansion of Aceh encouraged the Portuguese and Johor to sign a short-lived truce. During the rule of Iskandar Muda, Aceh attacked Johor in 1613 and again in 1615.

In the early 17th century, the Dutch reached Southeast Asia. At that time the Dutch were at war with the Portuguese and allied themselves to Johor. Two treaties were signed between Admiral Cornelis Matelief de Jonge and Raja Bongsu of Johor in 1606. The combined Johor-Dutch forces ultimately failed to capture Malacca in 1606. Finally in 1641, the Dutch and Johor headed by Bendahara Skudai, defeated the Portuguese in the Battle of Malacca. The Dutch took control of Malacca and agreed not to seek territories or wage war with Johor. By the time the fortress at Malacca surrendered, the town's population had already been greatly decimated by famine and disease.

With the fall of Portuguese Malacca in 1641 and the decline of Aceh due to the growing power of the Dutch, Johor started to re-establish itself as a power along the Straits of Malacca during the reign of Sultan Abdul Jalil Shah III (1623–1677). Jambi emerged as a regional economic and political power in Sumatra. Initially there was an attempt of an alliance between Johor and Jambi by way of a promised marriage. However, the alliance broke down and the Johor-Jambi war (1666–1679) ensued. After the sacking of Batu Sawar by Jambi in 1673, the capital of Johor was frequently moved to avoid the threat of attack. The sultan escaped to Pahang and died four years later. His successor, Sultan Ibrahim Shah (1677–1685), then engaged the help of the Bugis in the fight to defeat Jambi. Johor would eventually prevail in 1679, but also ended in a weakened position as the Bugis refused to return to Makassar where they came from. On top of this, the Minangkabaus of Sumatra also started to assert their influence.

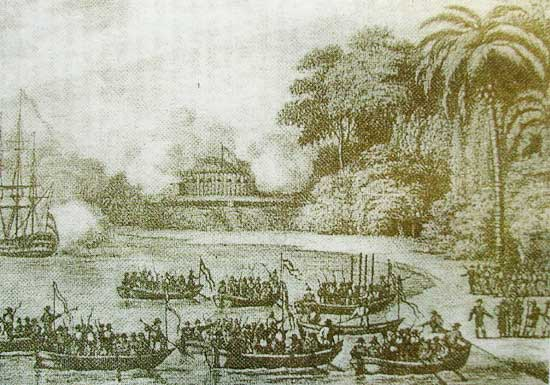
Johor-Dutch battle in the 1780s

In the 1690s the Bugis, who played an important role in defeating Jambi two decades earlier, had a major political influence in Johor. Both the Bugis and the Minangkabau realised how the death of Sultan Mahmud II in 1699 caused a power vacuum and allowed them to exert their power in Johor. The Minangkabau introduced a Minangkabau prince, Raja Kecil from Siak who claimed he was the posthumous son of Mahmud II. With the help of the Orang Laut, Raja Kecil then captured Riau in 1718, the then capital of the Johor Sultanate and installed himself as the new Johor Sultan, Jalil Rahmat Shah, without the knowledge of the Bugis. Raja Sulaiman of Johor dethroned Raja Kechil with help from the Bugis Daeng Parani and reclaimed the throne as Sultan Sulaiman Badrul Alam Shah (1722–1760), but he was a weak ruler and became a puppet of the Bugis. During the reign of Sultan Mahmud Shah III, the mid-to-late 18th century saw the Bugis attempting to expand their influence in the region. This brought them into conflicts with the Dutch, which resulted in a final major battle in 1784 between the two, which ended Bugis and Johor dominance in the region.

==== Perak Sultanate ====
Based on the Perak Royal Genealogy ("Salasilah Raja-Raja Perak"), the Perak Sultanate was formed in the early 16th century on the banks of the Perak River by the eldest son of Malaccan Sultan Mahmud Shah. He ascended to the throne as Muzaffar Shah I (1528–1549), first Sultan of Perak, after surviving the capture of Malacca by the Portuguese in 1511 and living quietly in Siak for a period. He became sultan through the efforts of Tun Saban, a local leader and trader between Perak and Klang. There had been no sultans in Perak when Tun Saban first arrived in the area from Kampar in Sumatra. Most of the area's residents were traders from Malacca, Selangor and Sumatra. Perak's administration became more organised after the Sultanate was established. With the opening up of Perak in the 16th century, the state became a source of tin ore. It appears that anyone was free to trade in the commodity, although the tin trade did not attract significant attention until the 1610s.

Sultanate of Aceh's influence in Perak, Kedah, Pahang, and Terengganu on the Malay Peninsula, c. 1570s

Throughout the early 17th century, the Sultanate of Aceh continually harassed most parts of the Malay Peninsula. Although Perak fell under the authority of Aceh, it remained entirely independent from Siamese control for over 200 years from 1612, in contrast with its neighbour, Kedah, and other northern Malay sultanates.

When the last Perak sultan of direct Malaccan lineage, Sallehuddin Riayat Shah died without an heir in 1635, a state of uncertainty prevailed in Perak. This was exacerbated by a deadly cholera epidemic. Perak chieftains were left with no alternative but to turn to Iskandar Thani of Aceh, who sent his relative, Raja Sulong, to become the new sultan of Perak, Muzaffar Shah II (1636–1653).

Aceh's influence on Perak began to wane when the Dutch East India Company (VOC) arrived, in the mid-17th century. When Perak refused to enter into a contract with the VOC as its northern neighbours had done, a blockade of the Perak River halted the tin trade, causing suffering among Aceh's merchants. In 1650, Aceh's Sultana Taj ul-Alam ordered Perak to sign an agreement with the VOC, on condition that the tin trade would be conducted exclusively with Aceh's merchants. By the following year, the VOC had secured a monopoly over the tin trade, setting up a store in Perak. Following the long competition between Aceh and the VOC over Perak's tin trade, on 15 December 1653, the two parties jointly signed a treaty with Perak granting the Dutch exclusive rights to tin extracted from mines located in the state.

In 1699, when Johor lost its last sultan of Malaccan lineage, Sultan Mahmud Shah II, Perak now had the sole claim of being the final heir of the old Sultanate of Malacca. However, Perak could not match the prestige and power of either the Malaccan or Johor Sultanates. Perak endured 40 years of civil war in the early 18th century, where rival princes were bolstered by local chiefs, the Bugis and Minang, all fighting for a share of tin revenues. The Bugis and several Perak chiefs were successful in ousting the Perak ruler, Sultan Muzaffar Riayat Shah III in 1743. In 1747, he only held power in north Perak and signed a treaty with the Dutch Commissioner Ary Verbrugge, under which Perak's ruler recognised Dutch monopoly over the tin trade and agreed to sell all the tin ore to Dutch traders.

==== Pahang Sultanate ====
The Old Pahang Sultanate centred in modern-day Pekan was established in the 15th century. At the height of its influence, the sultanate controlled the entire Pahang basin. The sultanate had its origins as a vassal to the Malaccan Sultanate. Its first sultan was a Malaccan prince, Muhammad Shah (1455–1475), himself the grandson of Dewa Sura, the last pre-Malaccan ruler of Pahang. Over the years, Pahang grew independent from Malaccan control and at one point even established itself as a rival state to Malacca until the latter's demise in 1511. In 1528, when the last Malaccan sultan died, the sultan at the time, Mahmud Shah I (c. 1519–1530) joined forces with the Sultan of Johor, Alauddin Riayat Shah II, and began to expel the Portuguese from the Malay Peninsula. Two attempts were made in 1547 at Muar and in 1551 at Portuguese Malacca. However, in the face of superior Portuguese arms and vessels, the Pahang and Johor forces were forced to retreat on both occasions.

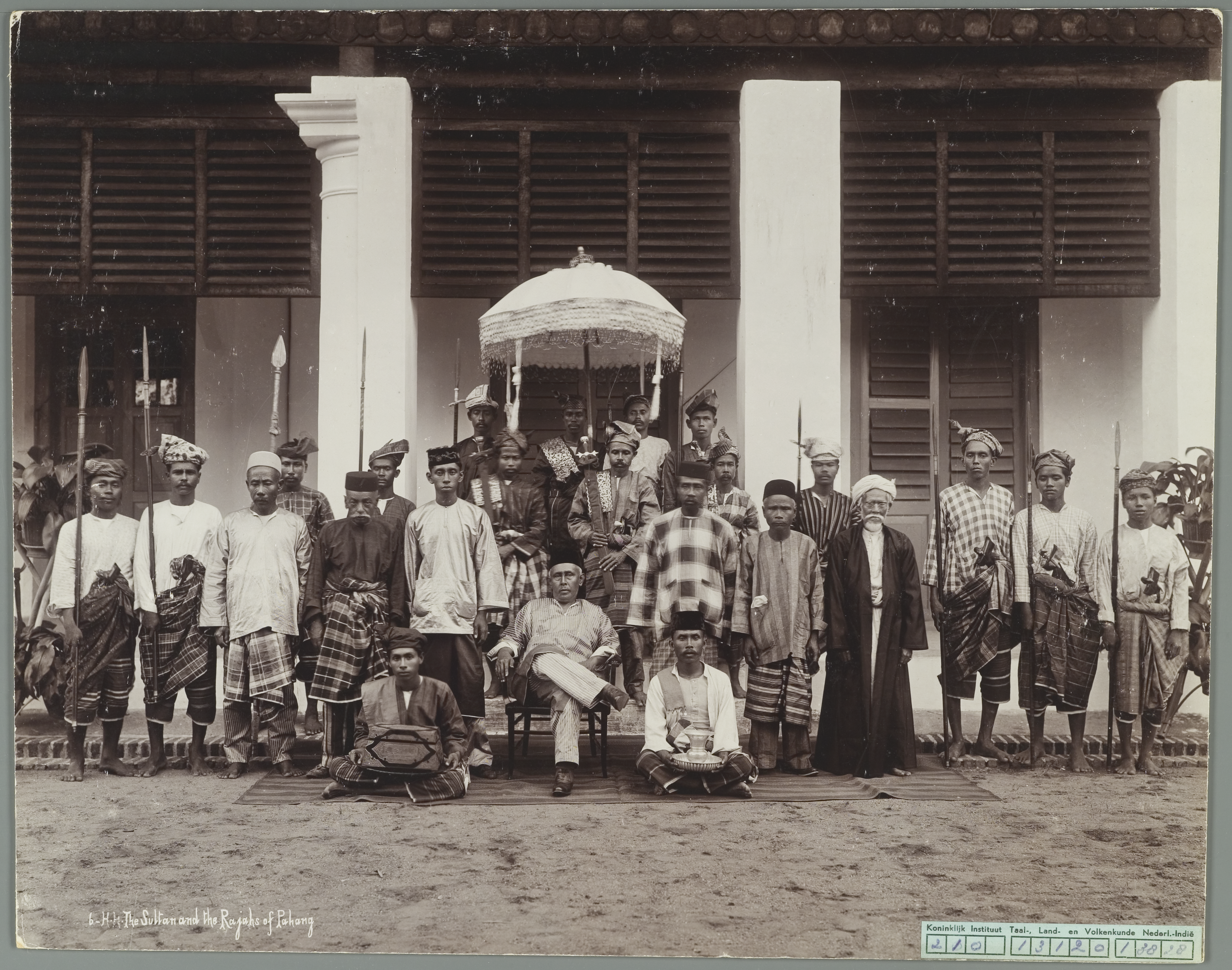
Photo of Sultan Ahmad Muʽazzam and his courtiers. Many years after the precolonial period. c. 1900.

During the reign of Sultan Abdul Kadir (1560–1590), Pahang enjoyed a brief period of cordial relations with the Portuguese in the second half of the 16th century. However, in 1607, following a visit by Admiral Matelief de Jonge of the Dutch Empire, Pahang cooperated with them in an attempt to get rid of the Portuguese. There was an attempt to establish a Johor-Pahang alliance to assist the Dutch. However, a quarrel erupted between Sultan Abdul Ghafur of Pahang (1592–1614) and Alauddin Riayat Shah III of Johor (1597–1615). This resulted in Johor declaring war on Pahang in 1612; with the aid of Sultan Abdul Jalilul Akbar of Brunei, Pahang eventually defeated Johor in 1613.

In 1615, the Acehnese Iskandar Muda invaded Pahang, forcing Alauddin Riayat Shah to retreat into the interior of Pahang. He nevertheless continued to exercise some ruling powers. His reign in exile is considered to have officially ended after the installation of a distant Johorean relative, Raja Bujang (Abdul Jalil Shah III) to the Pahang throne in 1615 with the support of the Portuguese. However, he was eventually deposed in the Acehnese invasion of 1617, but restored to the Pahang throne and also installed as the new Sultan of Johor following the death of his uncle, Sultan Abdullah Ma'ayat Shah in 1623. This event led to the union of the crown of Pahang and Johor, and the formal establishment of Pahang-ruled Johor.

==== Selangor Sultanate ====
During the 17th century Johor-Jambi war, Sultan Abdul Jalil Shah III (r. 1623–1677) of Johor engaged the help of Bugis mercenaries from Sulawesi to fight against Jambi. After Johor won in 1679, the Bugis decided to stay and asserted their power in the region. Many Bugis began to migrate and settle along the coast of Selangor such as the estuaries of the Selangor and Klang rivers. Some Minangkabaus may have also settled in Selangor by the 17th century, perhaps earlier. The Bugis and the Minangkabaus from Sumatra struggled for control of Johor. Raja Kecil, backed by the Minangkabaus, invaded Selangor but were driven off by the Bugis in 1742. To establish a power base, the Bugis led by Raja Salehuddin (1705–1788) founded the present hereditary Selangor Sultanate with its capital at Kuala Selangor in 1766. Selangor is unique as it is the only state on the Malay Peninsula that was founded by the Bugis.

=== Brunei Sultanate ===
Before its conversion to Islam, the oldest records of Brunei in Arabic sources defined it as "Sribuza", a Bornean vassal of Srivijaya. Arab historian Al-Ya'qubi writing in the 9th century recorded that the kingdom of Musa (probably referring to Brunei) was in alliance with the kingdom of Mayd (either Ma-i or Madja-as in the Philippines) against the Tang dynasty.

One of the earliest Chinese records of an independent kingdom in Borneo was the 977 letter to the Song dynasty emperor from the ruler of Boni (Brunei). The Bruneians regained their independence from Srivijaya due to the onset of a Javanese-Sumatran war. In 1225, the Chinese official Zhao Rukuo reported that Boni had 100 warships to protect its trade, and that there was great wealth in the kingdom. In the 14th century, a Chinese annal (Yuan Dade Nanhai zhi) reported that Boni invaded or administered present-day Sabah, some parts of Sarawak and ruled the formerly independent kingdoms of Butuan, Sulu and Mayd, as well as Malilu and Wenduling in present-day Manila and Mindanao, at northern and southern Philippines, respectively. Later, the Sulu kingdom invaded and occupied ports in Boni-ruled Sabah. They were later evicted with the help of the Majapahit Empire, which Brunei became a vassal to in the late 14th century. Nevertheless, the Sulus stole two sacred pearls from the Brunei king.

By the 15th century, the empire became a Muslim state, when the king of Brunei converted to Islam, brought Muslim Indians and Arab merchants from other parts of Maritime Southeast Asia, who came to trade and spread Islam. During the rule of Bolkiah (1485–1524) the empire controlled the coastal areas of northwest Borneo and reached the Philippines at Seludong (present-day Manila), the Sulu Archipelago and some parts of Mindanao which Brunei had incorporated via royal intermarriage with the rulers of Sulu, Manila and Maguindanao.

==== 16th–18th century ====
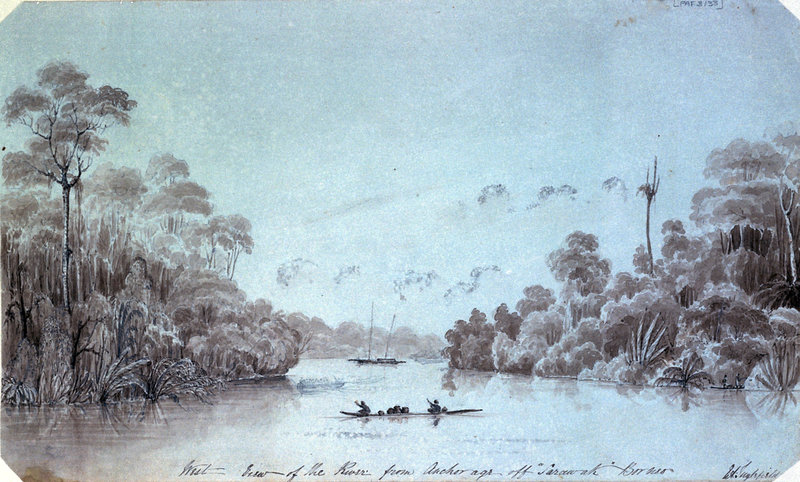
A view of a river from the anchorage off Sarawak, Borneo, c. 1800s. Painting from the National Maritime Museum of London.

In the 16th century, the Brunei's influence also extended as far as Kapuas River delta in southwestern Borneo. Other sultanates in the area had close relations with the Bruneian monarchy, in some cases effectively under the hegemony of the Brunei ruling family for periods of time, such as the Malay sultans of Pontianak, Samarinda and Banjarmasin. The Malay Sultanate of Sambas (present-day West Kalimantan), the Sultanate of Sulu and the Muslim rajahs of Manila had developed dynastic relations with the royal house of Brunei. The Sultanate of Sarawak (present-day Kuching; known to Portuguese cartographers as Cerava, and one of the five great seaports on the island of Borneo), though under the influence of Brunei, was self-governed under Sultan Tengah before being fully integrated into the Brunei upon his death in 1641.

Brunei began to decline during the arrival of western powers. Spain sent several expeditions from Mexico to invade and colonise Brunei's territories in the Philippines. Eventually the Spanish, their Visayan allies and their Latin-American recruits assaulted Brunei itself during the Castilian War. Though there were rapes, sacks and pillaging, the invasion was only temporary as the Spanish retreated. Brunei was unable to regain the territory it lost in the Philippines, yet it still maintained sway in Borneo.

==== 19th century ====
By the early 19th century, Sarawak had become a loosely governed territory under the control of the Brunei Sultanate. Brunei only had authority along the coastal regions of Sarawak where it was held by semi-independent Malay leaders. Meanwhile, the interior of Sarawak suffered from tribal wars fought by Iban, Kayan, and Kenyah peoples, who aggressively fought to expand their territories.

Following the discovery of antimony ore in the Kuching region, Pangeran Indera Mahkota (a representative of the Sultan of Brunei) began to develop the territory between 1824 and 1830. When antimony production increased, the Brunei Sultanate demanded higher taxes from Sarawak, which led to civil unrest and chaos. In 1839, Sultan Omar Ali Saifuddin II (1827–1852), ordered his uncle the Pengiran Muda Hashim to restore order. It was around this time that James Brooke arrived in Sarawak, and Pengiran Muda Hashim requested his assistance in the matter, but Brooke refused. However, he agreed to a further request during his next visit to Sarawak in 1840. On 24 September 1841, Pengiran Muda Hashim agreed to depose Pangeran Indera Mahkota and bestow the title of governor on James Brooke. This appointment was later confirmed by the Sultan of Brunei in 1842.

== Struggles for hegemony ==
The weakness of the small coastal Malay states led to the immigration of the Bugis, escaping from Dutch colonisation of Sulawesi, who established numerous settlements on the peninsula which they used to interfere with Dutch trade. Following the assassination of the last sultan of the Melaka royal line in 1699, the subsequent succession crisis led to a gradual increase in Bugis influence throughout the Johor-Riau region. The Bugis expanded their power in the states of Johor, Kedah, Perak, and Selangor. The Minangkabau from central Sumatra migrated into Malaya and eventually established their own state in Negeri Sembilan. The fall of Johor left a power vacuum on the Malay Peninsula, which was partly filled by the Siamese kings of the Ayutthaya Kingdom, who made the five northern Malay states—Kedah, Kelantan, Patani, Perlis, and Terengganu—their vassals.

The economic importance of Malaya to Europe grew rapidly during the 18th century. The fast-growing tea trade between China and the United Kingdom increased the demand for high-quality Malayan tin, which was used to line tea-chests. Malayan pepper also had a high reputation in Europe, while Kelantan and Pahang had gold mines. The growth of tin and gold mining and associated service industries led to the first influx of foreign settlers into the Malay world—initially Arabs and Indians, later Chinese.

=== Siamese expansion into Malaya ===
After the Fall of Ayutthaya in 1767, the Northern Malay Sultanates were freed from Siamese domination temporarily. In 1786, British trader Francis Light managed to obtain a lease of Penang Island from Sultan Ahmad Tajuddin Halim Shah II of Kedah on behalf of the East India Company. Siam re-exerted control over the Northern Malay Sultanates and sacked Pattani; Kedah came under Siamese suzerainty. King Rama II of Siam ordered Noi Na Nagara of Ligor to invade the Kedah Sultanate in 1821. Under the Burney Treaty of 1826, the exiled Kedah Sultan Ahmad Tajuddin was not restored to his throne. He and his armed supporters then fought in a series of wars known as Perang Musuh Bisik for his restoration over twelve years (1830–1842). When the Siamese army invaded and occupied Kedah between 1821 and 1842, local Arab families supported the Sultan's efforts to lead resistance. In 1842, Sultan Ahmad Tajuddin finally agreed to accept Siamese terms and was restored to his throne of Kedah. The following year, Syed Hussein Jamalullail was installed by the Siamese as the first Raja of Perlis, after the Sultan of Kedah gave his endorsement for the formation of Perlis; Siam separated Perlis into a separate principality directly vassal to Bangkok.

Around 1760, Long Yunus, an aristocratic warlord of Patani origin, succeeded in unifying the territory of present-day Kelantan and was succeeded in 1795 by his son-in-law, Tengku Muhammad, by Sultan Mansur of Terengganu. The enthronement of Tengku Muhammad by a noble from Terengganu was opposed by Long Yunus' sons, thus triggering a war against Terengganu by Long Muhammad, the eldest son of Long Yunus. The pro-Terengganu faction was defeated in 1800, and Long Muhammad ruled Kelantan with the new title of sultan as Sultan Muhammad I. Terengganu experienced stability under the reign of Sultan Omar Riayat Shah, who was remembered as a devout ruler who promoted trade and stable government. Under Thai rule, Terengganu prospered and was largely left alone by the authorities in Bangkok. However, in the Burney Treaty of 1826, the treaty acknowledged Siamese claims over several northern Malay states—Kedah, Kelantan, Perlis, Terengganu—the future Unfederated Malay States—and Patani. The treaty further guaranteed British possession of Penang and their rights to trade in Kelantan and Terengganu without Siamese interference. However, the five Malay-ethnic states were not represented in the treaty negotiation. In 1909, the parties of the agreement signed a new treaty that superseded the Burney Treaty and transferred four of the five Malay states from Siamese to British control, except for Patani. As Patani was not included in the Anglo-Siamese Treaty of 1909 and remained under Siamese rule, this led Patani to be excluded from the Federation of Malaya in 1957.

=== British influence ===
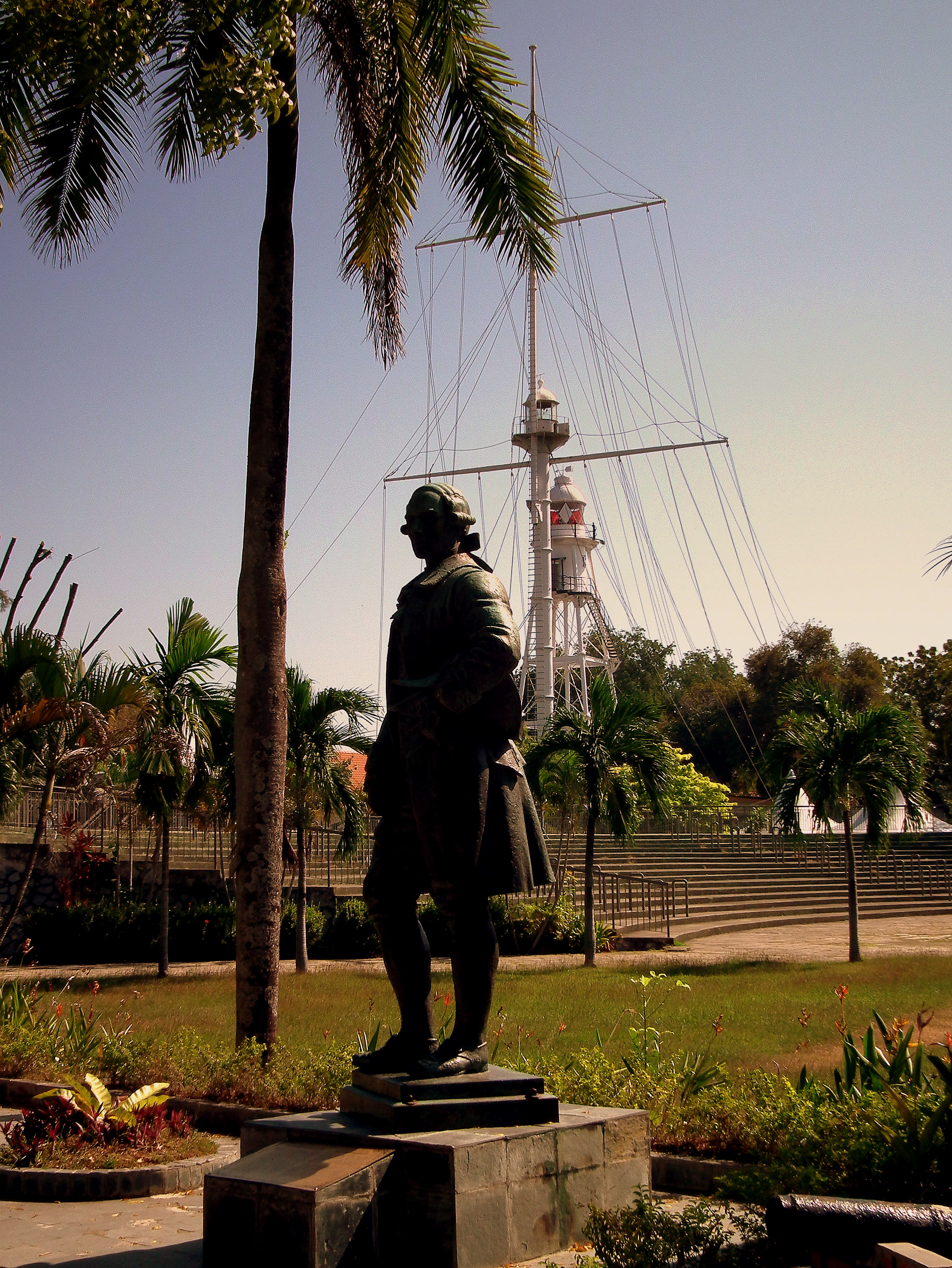
Statue of Francis Light in the Fort Cornwallis, Penang, marking the start of British rule in the Malay Archipelago

Before the mid-19th century, British interests in the region were predominantly economic, with little interest in territorial control. Already the strongest European power in India, the British were looking towards Southeast Asia for new territories. The growth of the China trade in British ships increased the East India Company's desire for bases in the region. Various islands were used for this purpose, but the first permanent acquisition was Penang, leased from the Sultan of Kedah in 1786. This was followed soon after by the leasing of a block of territory on the mainland opposite Penang (known as Province Wellesley). In 1795, during the Napoleonic Wars, the British, with the consent of the Dutch under French occupation, occupied Dutch Melaka to forestall possible French encroachment.

When Malacca was handed back to the Dutch in 1818, the British governor, Stamford Raffles, looked for an alternative base, and in 1819 he acquired Singapore from the Sultan of Johor. The exchange of the British colony of Bencoolen for Malacca with the Dutch left the British as the sole colonial power on the peninsula. The territories of the British were set up as free ports, attempting to break the monopoly held by the Dutch and French at the time, and making them large bases of trade. They allowed Britain to control all trade through the straits of Malacca. British influence was increased by Malayan fears of Siamese expansionism, to which Britain made a useful counterweight. During the 19th century, the Malay Sultans aligned themselves with the British Empire, due to the benefits of associations with the British and their fear of Siamese or Burmese incursions.

In 1824, British control in Malaya (before the name Malaysia) was formalised by the Anglo-Dutch Treaty, which divided the Malay Archipelago between Britain and the Netherlands. The Dutch evacuated Melaka and renounced all interest in Malaya, while the British recognised Dutch rule over the rest of the East Indies. By 1846, the British controlled Penang, Malacca, Singapore, and the island of Labuan, which they established as the crown colony of the Straits Settlements, administered first under the East India Company until 1867, when they were transferred to the Colonial Office in London.

Throughout the 19th century, the British became increasingly more active in the internal politics of the sultanates, such as its involvement in the Naning War (1831–1832), the Pahang Civil War (1857–1863), the Larut Wars (1861–1874), and the Klang War (1867–1874).

== Colonial era ==
=== British in Malaya ===
Initially, the British followed a policy of non-intervention in relations between the Malay states. The commercial importance of tin mining in the Malay states to merchants in the Straits Settlements led to infighting between the aristocracy on the peninsula. The destabilisation of these states damaged the commerce in the area. The wealth of Perak's tin mines made political stability there a priority for British investors and Perak was thus the first Malay state to agree to the supervision of a British resident. The Royal Navy was employed to bring about a peaceful resolution to civil disturbances caused by Chinese and Malay gangs employed in a political fight between Ngah Ibrahim and Raja Muda Abdullah. The Pangkor Treaty of 1874 paved the way for the expansion of British influence in Malaya. The British concluded treaties with some Malay states, installing residents who advised the Sultans and soon became the de facto rulers of their states. These advisors held power in everything except to do with Malay religion and customs.

Johor was the sole remaining state to maintain its independence, by modernising and giving British and Chinese investors legal protection. By the turn of the 20th century, the states of Pahang, Selangor, Perak, and Negeri Sembilan, known together as the Federated Malay States, had British advisors. In 1909 the Siamese kingdom was compelled to cede Kedah, Kelantan, Perlis and Terengganu, which already had British advisors, over to the British. Sultan Abu Bakar of Johor and Queen Victoria were personal acquaintances who recognised each other as equals. It was not until 1914 that Sultan Abu Bakar's successor, Sultan Ibrahim, accepted a British adviser. The four previously Siamese states and Johor were known as the Unfederated Malay States. The states under the most direct British control developed rapidly, becoming the largest suppliers in the world of first tin, then rubber.

By 1910, the pattern of British rule in the Malay lands was established. The Straits Settlements were a Crown colony, ruled by a governor under the supervision of the Colonial Office in London. Their population was roughly 50% Chinese-Malaysian, but all residents, regardless of race, were British subjects. The first four states to accept British residents, Perak, Selangor, Negeri Sembilan, and Pahang, were termed the Federated Malay States: while technically independent, they were placed under a Resident-General in 1895. The Unfederated Malay States had a slightly larger degree of independence. Johor, as Britain's closest ally in Malay affairs, had the privilege of a written constitution, which gave the Sultan the right to appoint his own Cabinet, but he was generally careful to consult the British first.

=== British in Borneo ===
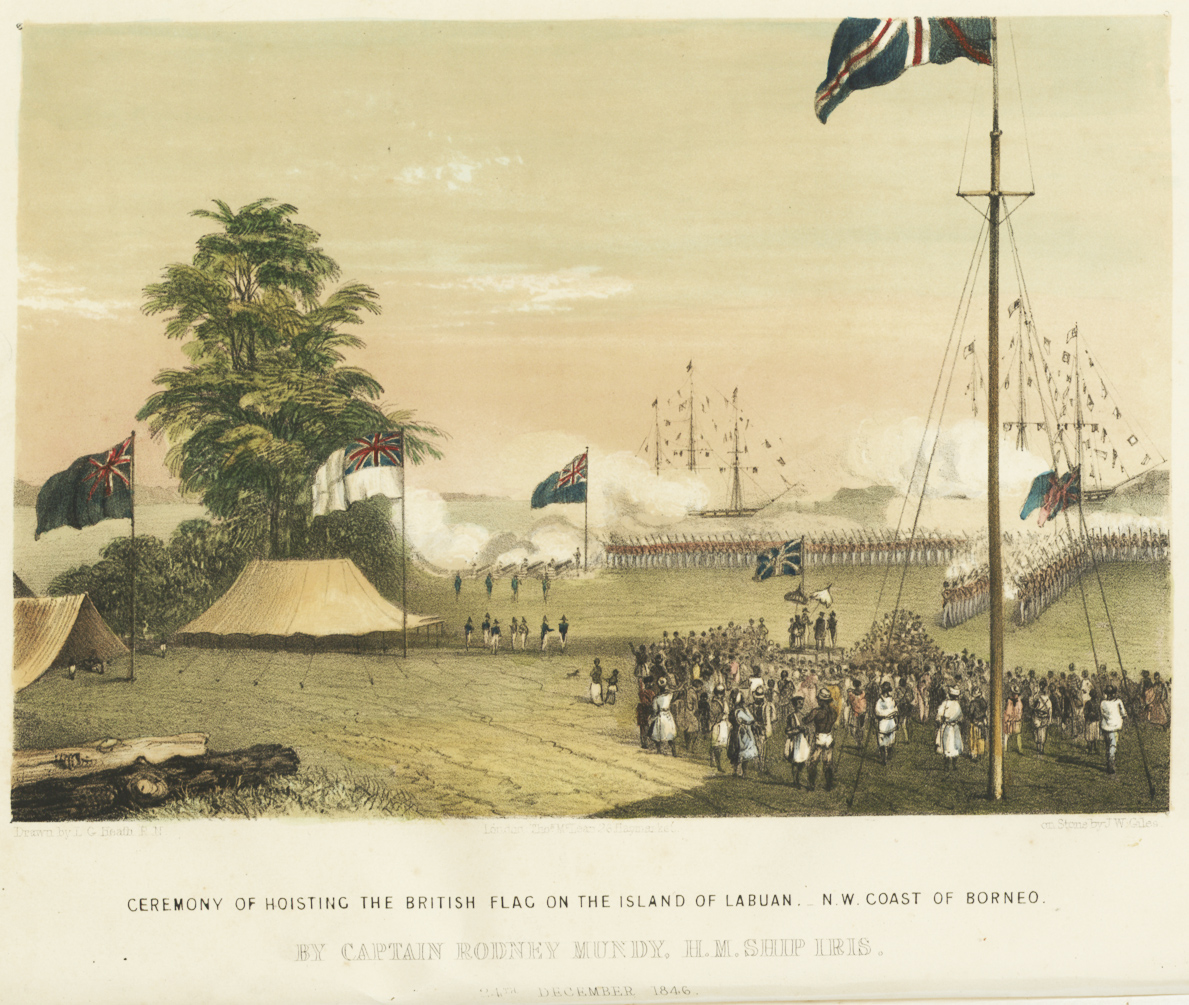
British flag hoisted for the first time on the island of Labuan on 24 December 1846

During the late 19th century the British also gained control of the north coast of Borneo. Development on the peninsula and Borneo were generally separate until the 19th century. The eastern part of this region (now Sabah) was under the nominal control of the Sultan of Sulu, who later became a vassal of the Spanish East Indies. The rest was the territory of the Sultanate of Brunei. In 1840, British adventurer James Brooke helped suppress a revolt, and in return received the title of raja and the right to govern the Sarawak River District in 1841. In 1843, his title was recognised as hereditary, and the "White Rajahs" began ruling Sarawak as a de facto independent state in 1846. The Brookes expanded Sarawak at the expense of Brunei.

In 1881, the British North Borneo Company was granted control of the territory of British North Borneo, appointing a governor and legislature. Its status was similar to that of a British Protectorate, and like Sarawak it expanded at the expense of Brunei. In 1947 Britain transferred control of the Turtle Islands and Mangsee Islands to the Philippine government, which had up until then been administered by the British North Borneo Company. Since the administration of President Diosdado Macapagal the Philippines have laid claim to eastern Sabah on the basis that the territory was part of the defunct Sultanate of Sulu's territory. In 1888, what was left of Brunei was made a British protectorate, and in 1891 another Anglo-Dutch treaty formalised the border between British and Dutch Borneo.

Evolution of Malaysia

=== Race relations during colonial era ===
In the pre-colonial period and the first few decades after formal colonial rule began in British Malaya, "Malay" was neither a racial category nor a fixed identity in the modern sense. The British imposed the concept of race on their colonial subjects.

Unlike some colonial powers, the British viewed their empire as an economic venture, expecting their colonies to generate profits for shareholders in London. Initially, British colonisers were drawn to the Malay Archipelago's tin and gold mines. Soon, however, British planters experimented with tropical plantation crops—tapioca, gambier, pepper, and coffee—and in 1877, introduced the rubber plant from Brazil. Rubber quickly became Malaya's primary export, driven by surging demand from European industry, and was later complemented by palm oil. These industries demanded a large labour force, prompting the British to bring workers from the longer-established British colony in India, mostly Tamil-speakers from South India, to serve as indentured labourers on plantations. Meanwhile, the mines, mills, and docks attracted numerous immigrant workers from southern China. As a result, towns like Singapore, Penang, and Ipoh, along with Kuala Lumpur—founded as a tin-mining centre in 1857—became majority Chinese. By 1891, when Malaya's first census was conducted, the main tin-mining states of Perak and Selangor had Chinese majorities.

Workers often faced violent treatment from contractors and frequent sickness. Many Chinese labourers saw their debts grow due to addictions to opium and gambling—vices that generated significant revenue for the British colonial government—while Indian labourers' debts increased through alcohol dependency. These debts tied workers to their labour contracts for extended periods.

Some Chinese immigrant workers were linked to networks of mutual aid societies (run by "Hui-Guan" 會館, or non-profit organisations). In the 1890s, Yap Ah Loy, the Kapitan China of Kuala Lumpur, emerged as Malaya's wealthiest individual, owning a chain of mines, plantations, and shops. From the outset, the Chinese dominated Malaya's banking and insurance sectors, and their businesses, often partnered with London firms, soon controlled the Malayan economy. Chinese bankers also lent money to Malay sultans, gaining both political and economic influence. Initially, most Chinese immigrants were men who married Malay women, creating a Sino-Malayan or baba community, but they later imported Chinese brides, establishing permanent settlements with schools and temples.

During the early 20th century, an Indian commercial and professional class emerged, though most Indians remained poor and uneducated, living in rural ghettos in rubber-growing regions.

Traditional Malay society suffered greatly from the loss of political sovereignty to British colonisers. The sultans, perceived as collaborators with both the British and the Chinese, lost some traditional prestige, yet most rural Malays continued to revere them. In the early 20th century, a small group of Malay nationalist intellectuals emerged, alongside a revival of Islam prompted by the perceived threat of imported religions, especially Christianity. Though few Malays converted to Christianity, many Chinese did. Northern regions, less exposed to Western ideas, became bastions of Islamic conservatism.

The British appointed elite Malays to positions in the police and local military units, while also opening most administrative positions to non-Europeans. By contrast, the Chinese largely funded their own schools and colleges, importing teachers from China, while the British sought to educate young Malay elites to reinforce colonial notions of race and class hierarchies. To this end, the colonial government established Malay College in 1905, dubbed "Bab ud-Darajat" (Gateway to High Rank), and launched the Malay Administrative Service in 1910. Later, they founded Sultan Idris Training College in 1922 and the Malay Women's Training College in 1935, both established to educate Malays. These efforts highlighted the colonial policy that Malaya belonged primarily to the Malays, treating other races as temporary residents—a view increasingly at odds with reality, fuelling resistance against British rule.

The colleges fostered Malay nationalist sentiments through its lectures and writings, earning recognition as the birthplace of Malay nationalism. In 1938, Ibrahim Yaacob, an alumnus of Sultan Idris College, founded the Kesatuan Melayu Muda (Young Malays Union or KMM) in Kuala Lumpur, marking it as British Malaya's first nationalist political organisation. The KMM championed Panji Melayu Raya, an ideal advocating the unification of British Malaya and the Dutch East Indies.

Before World War II, the colonial government grappled with balancing a centralised state and the sultans' authority. In 1935, they abolished the Resident-General position of the Federated States, decentralising powers to individual states, The colonial government regarded the Chinese as clever but dangerous, and in the 1920s and 1930s, the Kuomintang and Chinese Communist Party established rival clandestine organisations in Malaya, sparking frequent disturbances in Chinese towns.

Though part of the British Empire during World War I, Malaya experienced little combat, except for the sinking of the Russian cruiser Zhemchug by the German cruiser SMS Emden on 28 October 1914 in the Battle of Penang.

=== World War II and the state of emergency ===
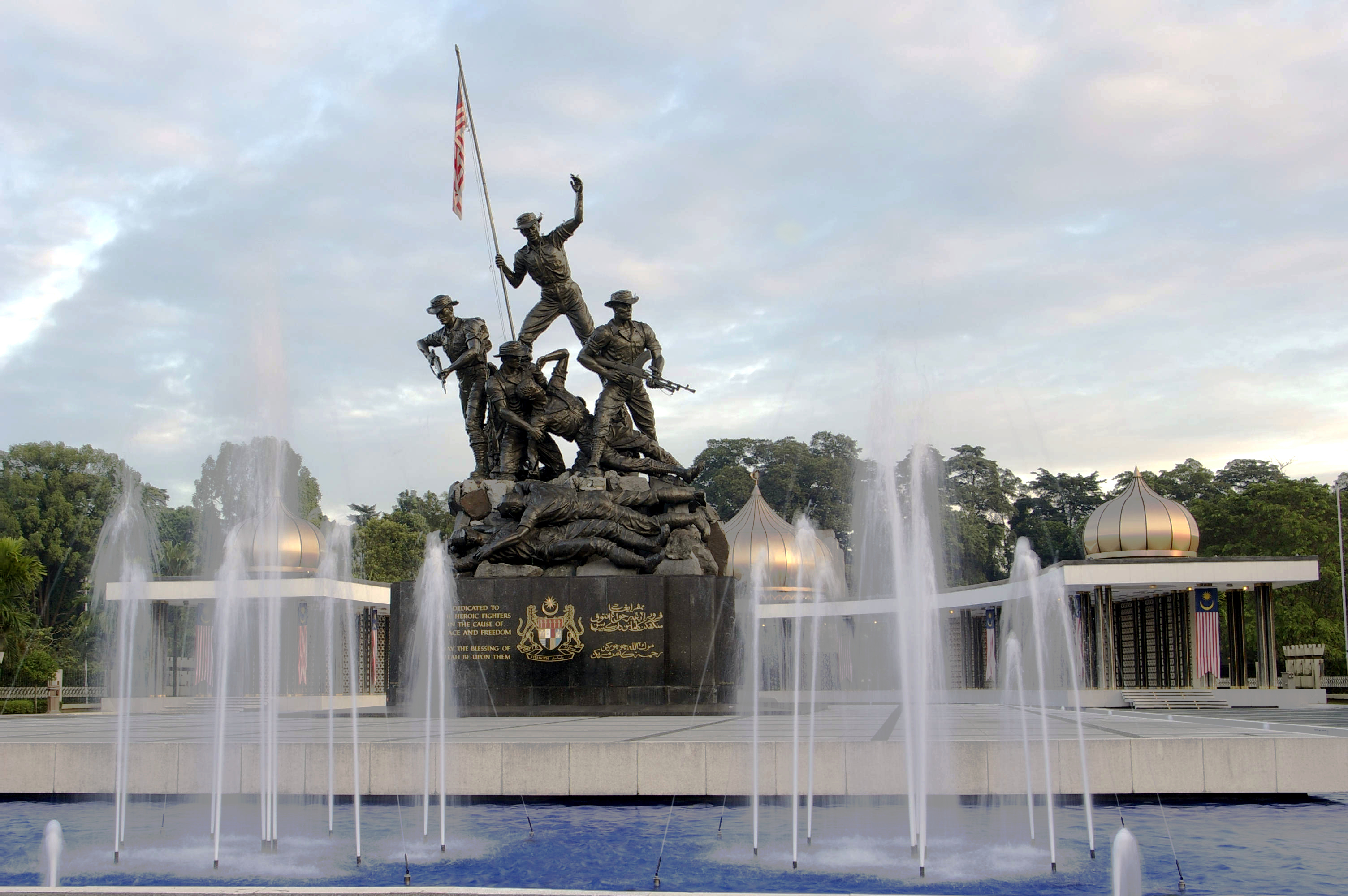
Tugu Negara, the Malaysian national monument, is dedicated to those who fell during World War II and the Malayan Emergency.

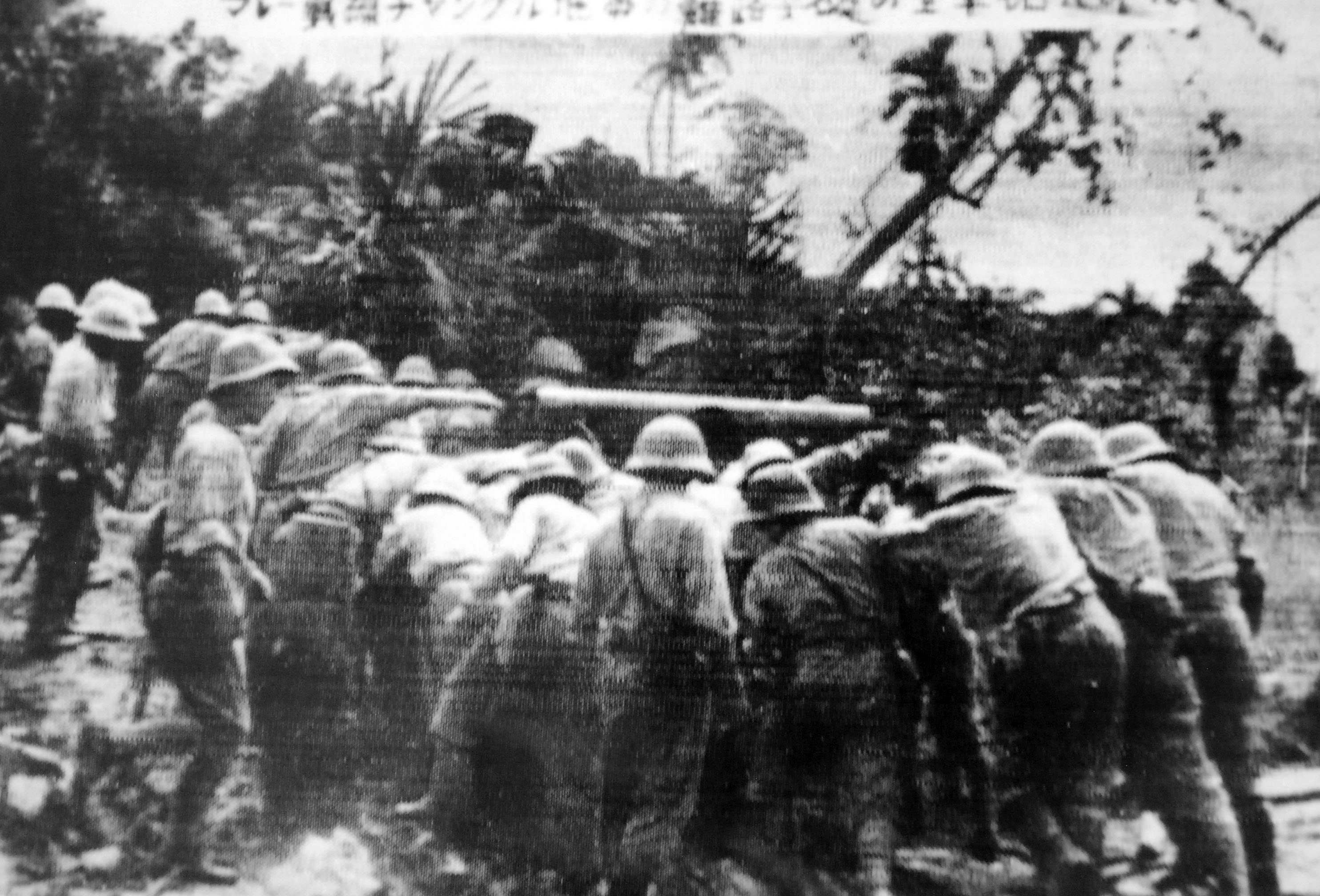
Japanese troops landed on Malaya in 1941.

The British in Malaya were unprepared for the outbreak of the Pacific War in December 1941. During the 1930s, anticipating the rising threat of Japanese naval power, they had constructed a major naval base at Singapore but had not foreseen an invasion of Malaya from the north. The Royal Air Force had virtually no air capacity in the Far East. Consequently, the Japanese attacked from their bases in French Indo-China with impunity and—despite resistance from British, Australian, and Indian forces—the Japanese army overran Malaya in two months. Singapore, lacking landward defences, air cover, and a water supply, surrendered in February 1942. The Japanese also occupied British Borneo.

The Japanese colonial administration viewed the Malays from a pan-Asian perspective and encouraged a limited form of Malay nationalism. The Malay nationalist group Kesatuan Melayu Muda, advocates of Melayu Raya, collaborated with the Japanese, believing Japan would unite the Dutch East Indies, Malaya, and Borneo and grant them independence. However, the Japanese treated the Chinese as enemy aliens with harshness: during the Sook Ching, they killed up to 80,000 Chinese in Malaya and Singapore. The Chinese, led by the Malayan Communist Party (MCP), formed the backbone of the Malayan Peoples' Anti-Japanese Army (MPAJA), which, with British assistance, became the most effective resistance force in occupied Asia.

Although the Japanese claimed to support Malay nationalism, they alienated Malay nationalists by allowing their ally Thailand to re-annex the four northern states—Kedah, Perlis, Kelantan, and Terengganu—that had been ceded to British Malaya in 1909. The collapse of Malaya's export markets caused widespread unemployment, affecting all ethnic groups and increasing Japanese unpopularity.

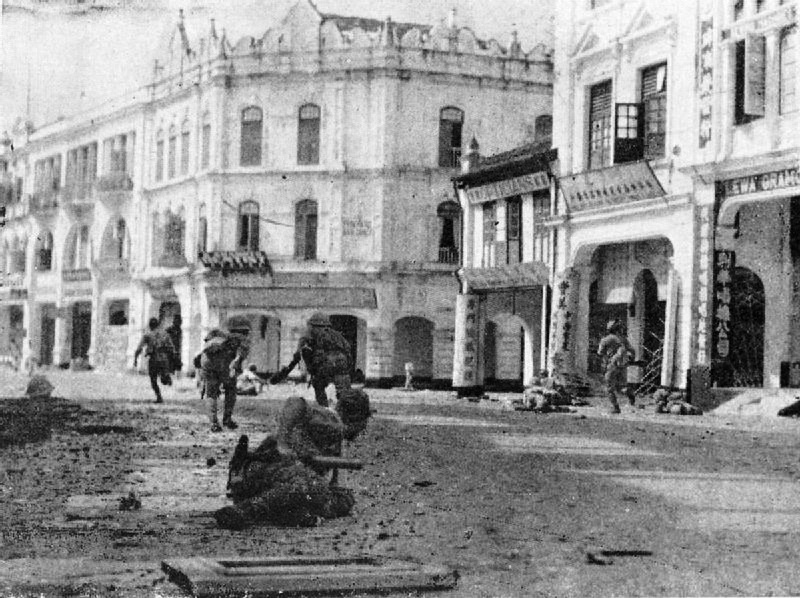
Japanese troops moving through Kuala Lumpur during their advance through Malaya

During the occupation, ethnic tensions intensified, and nationalism grew. Japan's surrender in August 1945 allowed British forces to reoccupy Malaya by September, beginning with Penang and Singapore. Many Malayans welcomed the British return in 1945, but the pre-war status quo was untenable, and the desire for independence strengthened. Britain, financially strained and led by the Labour government eager to withdraw forces from the East, faced new realities. However, most Malays focused on defending themselves against the MCP rather than demanding immediate independence from the British.

In 1944, the British drew up plans for a Malayan Union, which aimed to unite the Federated and Unfederated Malay States, along with Penang and Malacca, into a single Crown colony that would progress towards independence. The Bornean territories and Singapore were excluded, as their inclusion was thought to complicate the union's formation. However, the Malays strongly opposed the plan, objecting to the diminished power of the Malay rulers and the granting of citizenship to ethnic Chinese and other minorities. The British had opted for legalised racial equality, perceiving the Chinese and Indians as more loyal during the war than the Malays. Initially, the sultans supported the plan, but they later withdrew their backing and led the resistance.

In 1946, Malay nationalists, led by Dato Onn bin Jaafar, the Chief Minister of Johor, founded the United Malays National Organisation (UMNO). UMNO supported independence for Malaya, but only if the Malays exclusively governed the new state. Facing Malay opposition, the British abandoned the equal citizenship proposal. Consequently, the Malayan Union was established in 1946, and replaced by the Federation of Malaya in 1948, which restored the autonomy of the Malay states' rulers under British protection.

Meanwhile, the communists shifted towards open insurrection. The MPAJA had disbanded in December 1945, and the MCP had reorganised as a legal political party, though it had stored the MPAJA's arms for future use. The MCP advocated immediate independence with full equality for all races. Its strength laid in Chinese-dominated trade unions, especially in Singapore, and in Chinese schools. In March 1947, as the Cold War intensified and the international communist movement shifted left, the MCP purged its leader Lai Teck and replaced him with Chin Peng, a veteran MPAJA guerrilla, who steered the party towards direct action. Under MCP leadership, these rebels launched guerrilla operations to expel the British from Malaya. In June 1948, after a series of plantation manager assassinations, the colonial government retaliated by declaring a state of emergency, banning the MCP, and arresting hundreds of its militants. The MCP retreated to the jungle and formed the Malayan Peoples' Liberation Army, comprising about 13,000 mostly ethnic Chinese fighters.

The Malayan Emergency arose from Britain's new constitution, which classified about 90 percent of ethnic Chinese as non-citizens, and from the eviction of poor peasants to clear land for plantations. Although British authorities long depicted the conflict as a Cold War struggle against communism, the MNLA received scant support from Soviet or Chinese communists. Instead, British governments primarily sought to safeguard their commercial interests in the colony.

The Malayan Emergency spanned 1948 to 1960 and involved a prolonged anti-insurgency campaign by Commonwealth troops in Malaya. The British employed a successful strategy, formalised in 1950 as the Briggs Plan under General Sir Harold Briggs, to isolate the MCP from its support base through economic and political concessions to the Chinese and by forcibly resettling more than 400,000 rural inhabitants, mostly Chinese squatters, into guarded "new villages"—effectively concentration camps—in "white areas" free of MCP influence. From 1949, British measures, including arrests and early relocations, began to disrupt the MCP's campaign, with significant weakening and recruitment declines following the Briggs Plan's implementation in 1950. Although the MCP assassinated the British High Commissioner, Sir Henry Gurney, in October 1951, this shift to terrorist tactics distanced many moderate Chinese from the party.

The appointment of General Sir Gerald Templer as High Commissioner in 1952 intensified the weakening the Malayan Communist Party and contributing to the eventual decline of the Emergency. Templer developed and implemented modern counter-insurgency techniques against the MCP guerrillas in Malaya. The war saw abuses committed by both sides. The most notorious atrocity occurred in December 1948 at Batang Kali, a village north of the capital, Kuala Lumpur, where British troops massacred 24 Chinese villagers before burning the village to the ground. Heavy bombers were deployed, dropping thousands of bombs on insurgent positions, with Britain conducting 4,500 air strikes in the conflict's first five years. Although the insurgency was defeated, Commonwealth troops remained amid Cold War tensions with the Soviet Union. Against this backdrop, independence for the Federation within the Commonwealth was granted on 31 August 1957, with Tunku Abdul Rahman as the first prime minister.

== Emergence of Malaysia ==
=== Struggle for an independent Malaysia ===
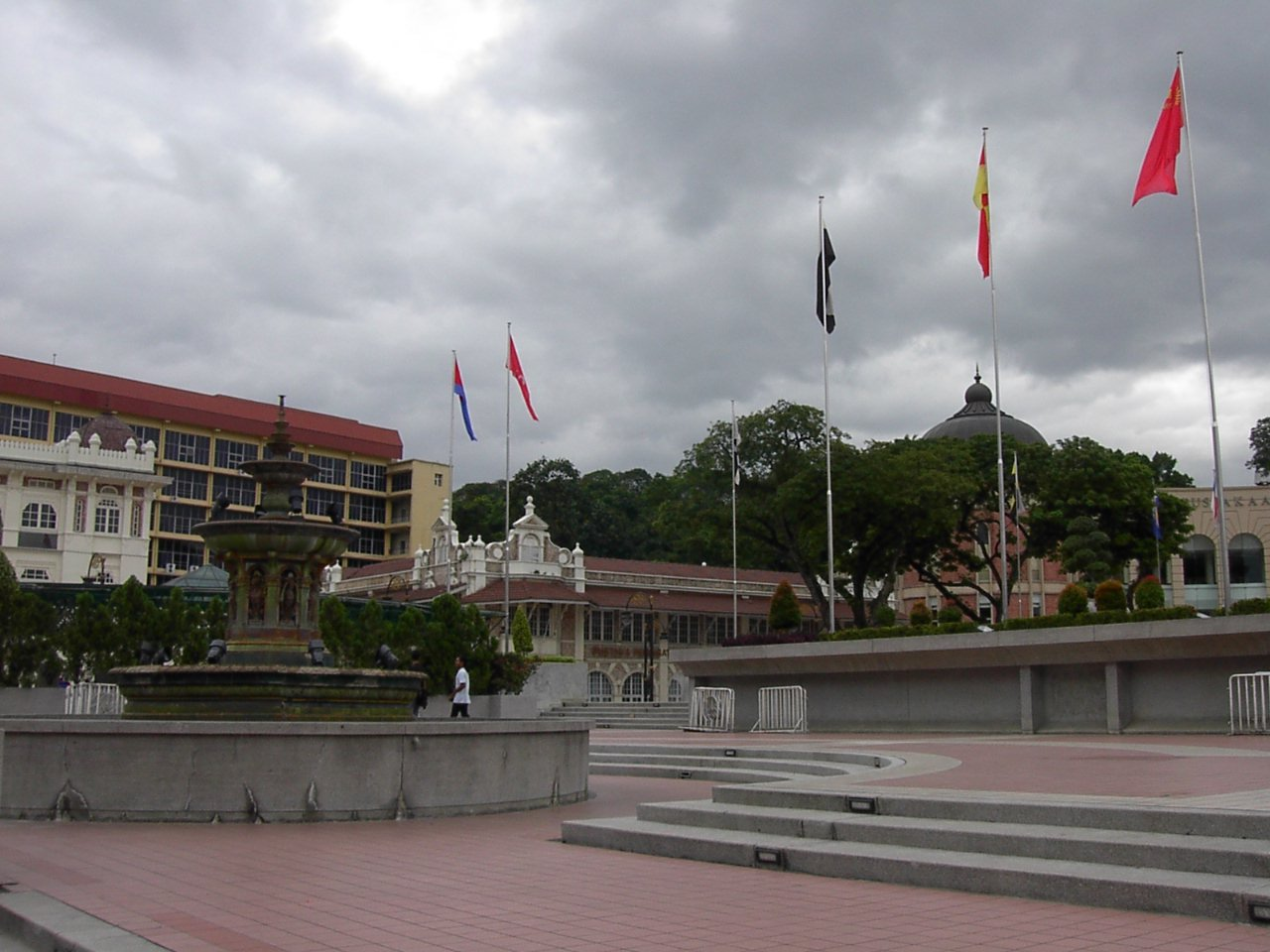
Dataran Merdeka (Independence Square) in Kuala Lumpur, where Malaysians celebrate Independence Day on 31 August each year

Chinese reaction against the MCP was shown by the formation of the Malayan Chinese Association (MCA) in 1949 as a vehicle for moderate Chinese political opinion. Its leader, Tan Cheng Lock, supported collaboration with UMNO to achieve Malayan independence through equal citizenship, while making sufficient concessions to Malay sensitivities to alleviate nationalist concerns. He formed a close collaboration with Tunku Abdul Rahman, the Chief Minister of Kedah and, from 1951, successor to Datuk Onn as leader of UMNO. Both leaders were determined to forge an agreement their communities could accept as the basis for a stable independent state. The UMNO-MCA alliance, which was later joined by the Malayan Indian Congress (MIC) to form the Alliance Party, won convincing victories in local and state elections in both Malay and Chinese areas between 1952 and 1955.

After Joseph Stalin's death in 1953, a split emerged in the MCP leadership over the wisdom of continuing the armed struggle. Many MCP militants lost heart and returned home, and by the time Templer left Malaya in 1954, the Emergency appeared to be waning, although it would not officially end until 1960. Chin Peng led a resolute group that lingered in the inaccessible terrain along the Thai border for many years.

During 1955 and 1956, UMNO, the MCA, and the British colonial authorities negotiated a constitutional settlement based on the principle of equal citizenship for all races. In exchange, the MCA agreed that Malaya's head of state would be drawn from the ranks of the Malay rulers, that Malay would be the official language, and that Malay education and economic development would be promoted and subsidised. In effect, this meant that Malaya would be governed by the Malays, but the Chinese and Indians would have proportionate representation in the Cabinet and Parliament, would govern states where they formed the majority, and would enjoy protection of their economic positions. The difficult issue of who would control the education system was deferred until after independence.

The constitutional negotiations took place alongside the ongoing Malayan Emergency and efforts to resolve the communist insurgency. In December 1955, Chief Minister Tunku Abdul Rahman met with Communist Party of Malaya leader Chin Peng and other representatives at the Baling Talks. The talks were intended to explore a negotiated end to the Emergency, but broke down when the two sides could not agree on the conditions under which the Communist Party of Malaya could cease its armed struggle. The failure of the talks reinforced the Alliance government's position that independence should be achieved through constitutional means while the communist insurgency was dealt with separately.

After the Japanese surrender, the Brooke family and the British North Borneo Company relinquished control of Sarawak and North Borneo respectively, and these became British Crown colonies. They were far less economically developed than Malaya, and their local political leaders were too weak to demand independence. Singapore, with its large Chinese majority, achieved autonomy in 1955, and in 1959 Lee Kuan Yew became prime minister. The Sultan of Brunei remained a British client in his oil-rich enclave. Between 1959 and 1962, the British government orchestrated complex negotiations between these local leaders and the Malayan government.

On 24 April 1961, Lee Kuan Yew proposed the idea of forming Malaysia to Tunku Abdul Rahman during a meeting. Deputy Malayan Prime Minister Abdul Razak supported the idea of the new federation and worked to convince Abdul Rahman to back it. On 27 May 1961, Abdul Rahman proposed the idea of forming "Malaysia", which would consist of Brunei, Malaya, North Borneo, Sarawak, and Singapore, all of which, except Malaya, were still under British rule. It was stated that this would allow the central government to better control and combat communist activities, especially in Singapore. It was also feared that, if Singapore became independent, it would become a base for Chinese chauvinists to threaten Malayan sovereignty. The inclusion of British territories besides Singapore was intended to maintain an ethnic composition similar to that of Malaya, with the Malay and indigenous populations of the other territories balancing the Chinese majority in Singapore.

Although Lee Kuan Yew supported the proposal, his opponents from the Singaporean Socialist Front (Barisan Sosialis) resisted it. In North Borneo, where there were no political parties, community representatives also expressed opposition. Although the Sultan of Brunei supported the merger, the Parti Rakyat Brunei opposed it. At the Commonwealth Prime Ministers' Conference in 1961, Abdul Rahman explained his proposal further to its opponents. In October 1961, he obtained agreement from the British government for the plan, provided that feedback was obtained from the communities involved in the merger.

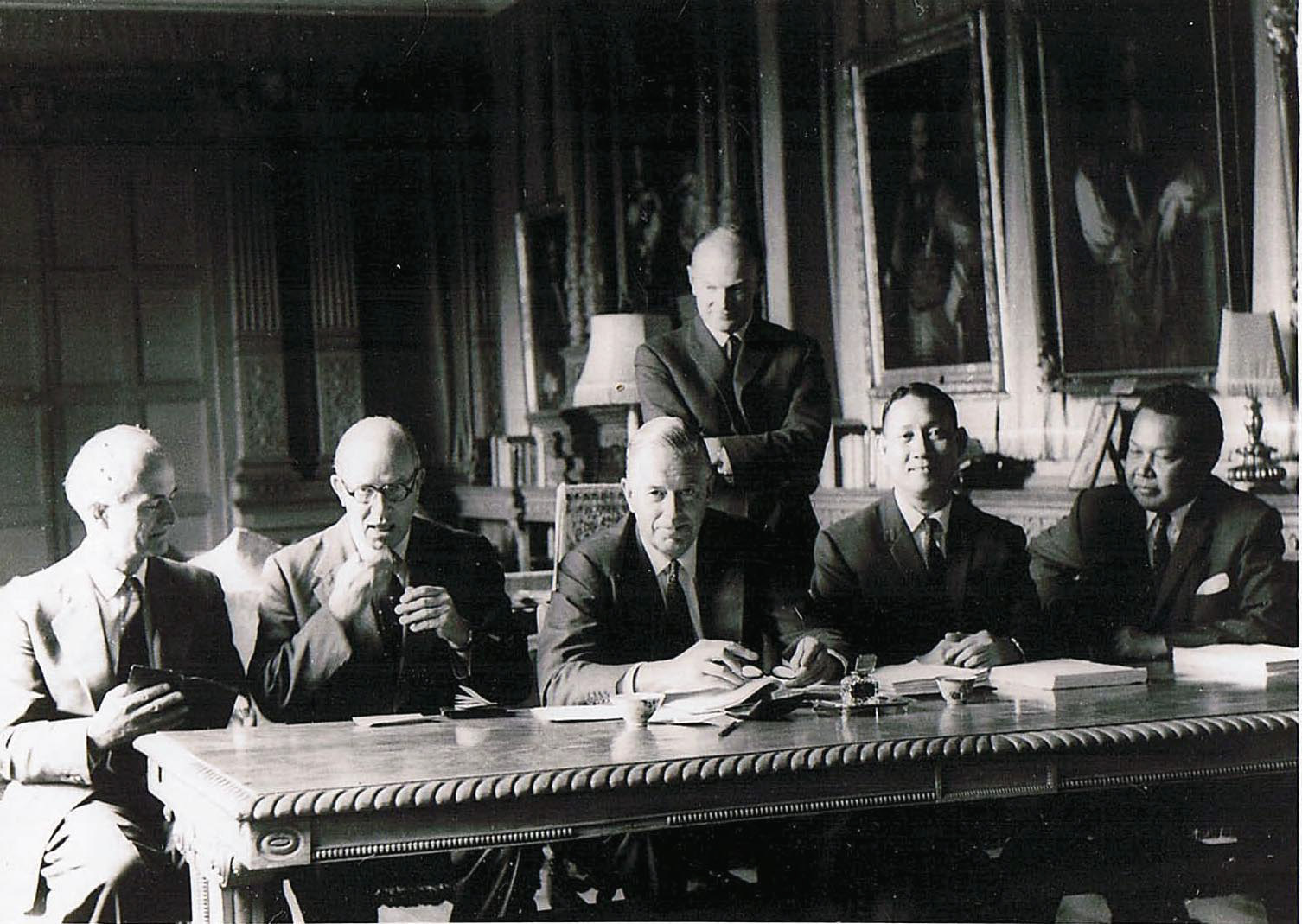
Members of the Cobbold Commission were formed to conduct a study in the British Borneo territories of Sarawak and Sabah to see whether the two were interested in the idea to form the Federation of Malaysia with Malaya and Singapore.

The Cobbold Commission approved a merger with North Borneo and Sarawak; however, it was found that a substantial number of Bruneians opposed the merger. North Borneo drew up a list of points, referred to as the 20-point agreement, proposing terms for its inclusion in the new federation. Sarawak prepared a similar memorandum, known as the 18-point agreement. Some of the points in these agreements were incorporated into the eventual constitution; some were instead accepted orally. These memoranda are often cited by those who believe that Sarawak's and North Borneo's rights have eroded over time. A referendum was conducted in Singapore to gauge opinion, and 70% supported the merger with substantial autonomy granted to the state government. The Sultanate of Brunei withdrew from the planned merger due to opposition from segments of its population, as well as arguments over the payment of oil royalties and the status of the sultan in the planned merger. Additionally, the Parti Rakyat Brunei staged an armed revolt, which, though suppressed, was viewed as potentially destabilising to the new nation.

After reviewing the Cobbold Commission's findings, the British government appointed the Lansdowne Commission to draft a constitution for Malaysia. The eventual constitution was essentially the same as the 1957 constitution, albeit with some rewording—for instance, giving recognition to the special position of the natives of the Borneo States. North Borneo, Sarawak, and Singapore were also granted some autonomy unavailable to the states of Malaya. After negotiations in July 1963, it was agreed that Malaysia would come into being on 31 August 1963, consisting of Malaya, North Borneo, Sarawak, and Singapore. The date was chosen to coincide with Malaya's independence day and the British granting self-rule to Sarawak and North Borneo. However, Indonesia and the Philippines strenuously objected to this development, with Indonesia claiming Malaysia represented a form of "neocolonialism" and the Philippines claiming North Borneo as its territory. Opposition from the Indonesian government, led by Sukarno, and attempts by the Sarawak United People's Party delayed the formation of Malaysia. Due to these factors, an eight-member UN team was formed to ascertain whether North Borneo and Sarawak truly wanted to join Malaysia. Malaysia formally came into being on 16 September 1963, consisting of Malaya, North Borneo, Sarawak, and Singapore. In 1963, the total population of Malaysia was about 8 million.

=== Challenges of independence ===
At the time of independence, Malaya had significant economic advantages. It was among the world's leading producers of three valuable commodities: rubber, tin, and palm oil, and a notable iron ore producer. These exports provided the Malayan government a substantial surplus for industrial development and infrastructure projects. Like other post-colonial developing nations in the 1950s and 1960s, Malaya (and later Malaysia) emphasized economic state planning, though UMNO was never a socialist party. The First and Second Malayan Plans (1956–1960 and 1961–1965, respectively) spurred economic growth through state investment in industry and infrastructure repair. The government aimed to reduce Malaya's reliance on commodity exports, recognizing that demand for natural rubber would decline as synthetic rubber production expanded.

On 15 September 1963, the day before Malaysia's formation, Indonesia and the Philippines withdrew their ambassadors from Malaya. In Jakarta, the British and Malayan embassies were stoned, and the British consulate in Medan was ransacked, with Malaysia's consul taking refuge in the US consulate. Malaysia withdrew its ambassadors in response and requested Thailand to represent it diplomatically in both countries.

Indonesian President Sukarno, supported by the powerful Communist Party of Indonesia (PKI), viewed Malaysia as a "neocolonialist" plot against his country and backed a communist insurgency in Sarawak, primarily involving elements of the local Chinese community. Indonesian irregular forces infiltrated Sarawak and were contained by Malaysian and Commonwealth of Nations forces. This period of Konfrontasi (an economic, political, and military confrontation) lasted until the downfall of Sukarno in 1966. The Philippines objected to the federation's formation, claiming North Borneo as part of Sulu, and thus the Philippines. In 1966, President Ferdinand Marcos dropped the claim, though it has since been revived, straining Malaysia–Philippines relations.

==== Racial strife ====
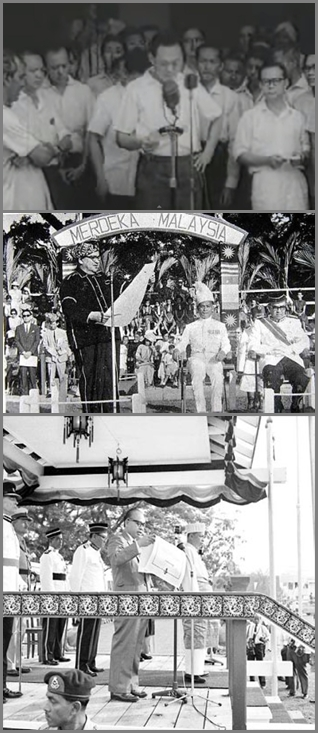
The proclamation on the formation of the independent Federation of Malaysia by Lee Kuan Yew (top) for Singapore; Donald Stephens (centre) for North Borneo and Stephen Kalong Ningkan (bottom) for Sarawak. However, Singapore left the Federation less than two years after the merger due to racial issues.

The Great Depression of the 1930s, followed by the Sino-Japanese War, ended Chinese emigration to Malaya. At the time of independence in 1957, Malays comprised 50% of the Federation of Malaya population, Chinese 38%, Indians 11%, and others 1%. This balance was altered by increasing the Chinese population through the inclusion of majority-Chinese Singapore, raising concerns among Malays. The federation increased the Chinese proportion to nearly 40%. Both UMNO and the MCA were concerned about the possible appeal of Lee's People's Action Party (PAP) — then seen as a radical socialist party — to voters in Malaya and supported the Singapore Alliance Party to challenge Lee's position there. Lee, in turn, threatened to run PAP candidates in Malaya at the 1964 federal elections, despite an earlier agreement not to do so (see PAP–UMNO relations). Racial tensions intensified as PAP created an opposition alliance promoting multiracialism and social justice. This provoked Tunku Abdul Rahman to demand that Singapore withdraw from Malaysia. Despite efforts by Singapore's leaders to remain in the federation, on 9 August 1965, the Malaysian Parliament voted 126–0 in favour of the expulsion of Singapore.

The most debated issues of independent Malaysia were education and the disparity of economic power among ethnic communities. The Malays were concerned about the wealth of the Chinese community, even after Singapore's expulsion in 1965. Malay political movements emerged, focused on addressing economic disparity. Since there was no effective opposition party, these issues were contested mainly within the coalition government, which won a strong majority of 74 out of 104 seats in the 1959 Malayan Parliament election. The two issues were related. The Chinese advantage in education helped maintain their economic dominance, which UMNO leaders were determined to end. The MCA leaders were in a dilemma between defending Chinese economic and educational interests and maintaining good relations with UMNO. This produced a crisis in the MCA in 1959, in which Lim Chong Eu's more assertive leadership disagreed with UMNO over the education issue, only to be forced to back down when Tunku Abdul Rahman threatened to break up the coalition.

The Education Act of 1961 formalized UMNO's education policy. Thereafter, Malay and English were the only teaching languages in secondary schools, and state primary schools taught in Malay only. Although the Chinese and Indian communities could maintain their own Chinese and Tamil-language primary schools, all students were required to learn Malay and study an agreed national curriculum. Most importantly, the entrance exam to the University of Malaya (which moved from Singapore to Kuala Lumpur in 1962) was conducted in Malay, even though most teaching at the university was in English until the 1970s. This excluded many Chinese students from university admission. At the same time, Malay schools were heavily subsidized, and Malays received prioritized support. This defeat for the MCA over the Education Act greatly weakened its support in the Chinese community.

As in education, the UMNO government's primary goal in economic development was to shift economic power from the Chinese to the Malays. The two Malayan Plans and the First Malaysia Plan (1966–1970) allocated resources to development projects benefiting the rural Malay community. The Federal Land Development Authority (FELDA) and other agencies enabled Malay smallholders to upgrade their production and increase their incomes. The state provided incentives and low-interest loans to help Malays start businesses and began favoring Malay companies in government tendering, prompting some Chinese-owned businesses to appoint Malay managers.

==== Crisis of 1969 and communist insurgency ====
The collaboration between the MCA and the MIC in these policies weakened their influence over the Chinese and Indian electorates. At the same time, the government's affirmative action policies of the 1950s and 1960s created a discontented class of educated but underemployed Malays. This led to the formation of a new party, the Malaysian People's Movement (Gerakan), in 1968. Gerakan was intentionally designed as a non-communal party, incorporating Malay trade unionists and intellectuals alongside Chinese and Indian leaders. Meanwhile, the Islamic Party of Malaysia (PAS), an Islamist party, and the Democratic Action Party (DAP), a democratic socialist party, gained growing support at the expense of UMNO and the MCA, respectively.

Following the conclusion of the Malayan Emergency, the predominantly ethnic Chinese Malayan National Liberation Army, the armed wing of the Malayan Communist Party, retreated to the Malaysia-Thailand border. There, they regrouped and retrained for future offensives against the Malaysian government. The insurgency officially began on 17 June 1968, when the MCP ambushed security forces in Kroh–Betong, in northern Peninsular Malaysia. Rather than declaring a "state of emergency" as the British had done earlier, the Malaysian government introduced several policy initiatives in response to the insurgency, including the Security and Development Program (KESBAN), Rukun Tetangga (Neighbourhood Watch), and the People's Volunteer Corps (RELA Corps).

In the 1969 federal elections, the UMNO-MCA-MIC Alliance secured only 48% of the vote, although it retained a majority in the legislature. The MCA lost most of the Chinese-majority seats to Gerakan and DAP candidates. This outcome led to a Malay backlash, which triggered the riots and inter-communal violence. Approximately 6,000 Chinese homes and businesses were burned, and at least 184 people were killed. Western diplomatic sources at the time estimated the death toll to be closer to 600, with most victims being Chinese. In response, the government declared a state of emergency, and the National Operations Council, led by Deputy Prime Minister Abdul Razak Hussein, assumed power. In September 1970, Prime Minister Tunku Abdul Rahman stepped down and was succeeded by Abdul Razak.

Using the newly-gained emergency powers, the new government suspended Parliament, briefly imposed press censorship, and placed severe restrictions on political activity. The Internal Security Act together with emergency laws were used to detain individuals indefinitely without trial. These powers were frequently used to suppress dissent. Additionally, a later constitutional amendment passed after the Parliament reconvened prohibited criticism of the Malaysian monarchy, the special position of Malays, or the status of Malay as the national language, even within Parliament.

In 1971, Parliament reconvened, and the controversial New Economic Policy (NEP) was introduced by Prime Minister Tun Abdul Razak to increase the economic participation of bumiputras relative to other ethnic groups. In 1974, a new coalition government, the Barisan Nasional, was established to replace the Alliance party and include PAS, Gerakan, and other parties. Abdul Razak remained in office until his death in 1976, when Hussein Onn succeeded him and advanced NEP policies until 1981. In 1977, PAS was expelled from BN after opposing federal intervention in the Kelantan Emergency, triggered by a political impasse. On 16 July 1981, Mahathir Mohamad became Prime Minister, serving for 22 years, the longest tenure in Malaysian history. During his administration, Malaysia experienced rapid economic growth and implemented numerous large-scale development projects. Key policies, including the NEP, transformed Malaysia’s economy and society, maintaining a delicate ethno-political balance through economic growth and policies promoting equitable participation among all races.

== Modern Malaysia ==
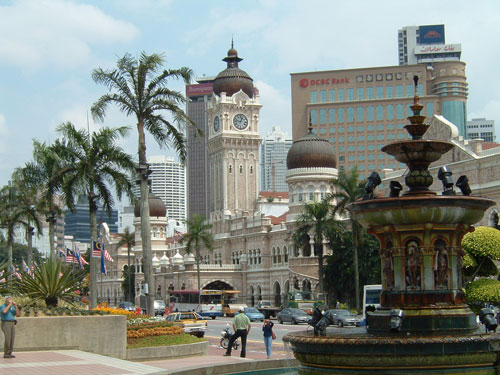
Kuala Lumpur, a blend of old and new

In 1970, three-quarters of Malaysians living below the poverty line were ethnic Malays, most of whom were rural workers largely excluded from Malaysia's modern economy. The government introduced the New Economic Policy (NEP) in 1971 to address these disparities, with a series of four five-year plans scheduled from 1971 to 1990. The NEP aimed to achieve two main goals: reducing poverty, especially in rural areas, and addressing the economic imbalance by eliminating the association between race and economic prosperity.

This latter goal was interpreted as a strategic shift in economic opportunities from the Chinese community to the Malays, who, at that time, represented only 5% of the professional workforce. To increase Malay participation in the modern economy, the government established several state-owned enterprises and agencies, including Perbadanan Nasional Berhad (PERNAS), Petroliam Nasional Berhad (PETRONAS), and the Heavy Industries Corporation of Malaysia (HICOM). These entities not only directly employed Malay workers but also invested in growing sectors of the economy, creating new technical and administrative roles often allocated to Malays. Consequently, Malay equity in the economy increased from 1.5% in 1969 to 20.3% by 1990.

=== Mahathir administration ===
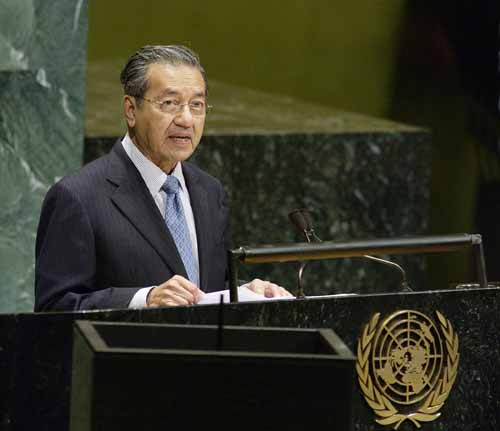
Mahathir Mohamad was the leading force in making Malaysia into a major industrial power.

Mahathir Mohamad was sworn in as the fourth Prime Minister of Malaysia on 16 July 1981. One of his initial actions was to release 21 detainees held under the Internal Security Act (ISA).

During his early tenure, Mahathir implemented an assertive economic strategy, exemplified by the Guthrie Dawn Raid on 7 September 1981. This strategic economic maneuver, executed by Permodalan Nasional Berhad (PNB), enabled Malaysia to reclaim control of Guthrie Corporation, a British-owned plantation company, by rapidly acquiring its shares on the London Stock Exchange. The operation transferred approximately 200,000 acres of agricultural land into Malaysian ownership, aligning with the New Economic Policy (NEP) objectives of increasing Bumiputera equity. However, the raid strained diplomatic relations with the United Kingdom. In response, British Prime Minister Margaret Thatcher tightened stock market regulations, while Malaysia introduced the "Buy British Last" policy in October 1981, prioritizing non-British suppliers in government procurements. Diplomatic reconciliation occurred in 1983 when Thatcher hosted Mahathir at 10 Downing Street, leading to agreements on student subsidies, technical assistance programs, and the resolution of the landing rights issue.

To promote economic development and reduce dependence on Western models, Mahathir introduced the Look East Policy in 1982, encouraging Malaysians to adopt the work ethics, industrial strategies, and economic practices of Japan and South Korea. Alongside this policy, the government emphasized industrialisation to diversify the economy away from agriculture. The establishment of the Heavy Industries Corporation of Malaysia (HICOM) in 1983 led to the launch of Malaysia's first national car, the Proton Saga, in 1985 by Proton, Malaysia's automotive company.

The government introduced its privatisation policy in the early 1980s to improve efficiency, reduce government expenditure, and encourage private-sector growth. Privatization efforts spanned key sectors, including telecommunications, utilities, and transportation, attracting foreign investment and supporting Malaysia's economic growth. This program complemented Mahathir's broader focus on industrialization and infrastructure, establishing a foundation for major development projects in later years.

Mahathir sought to redefine the balance of power between the monarchy and Parliament through a constitutional amendment in 1983. This amendment required the Yang di-Pertuan Agong to assent to any bill within 15 days of its passage by Parliament; otherwise, it would automatically become law. Additionally, it proposed transferring the power to declare a state of emergency from the Agong to the prime minister. Initially supported by the Agong at the time, the proposal was later met with hesitation from him and the Sultans, who baulked at its implications for state-level legislation. A public standoff ensued, with Mahathir organizing rallies to gather public support. The crisis concluded with a compromise, retaining the Agong's emergency powers but allowing Parliament to override a veto by re-passing the bill.

In Mahathir's early years as prime minister, Malaysia saw a resurgence of Islam and conservatism among the Malay population. Pan-Malaysian Islamic Party (PAS), which had previously joined UMNO in government during the 1970s, responded to this shift by adopting a more assertive Islamist stance under the leadership of Yusof Rawa. Mahathir sought to appeal to religious voters by establishing institutions such as the International Islamic University of Malaysia (IIUM) to promote Islamic education within a framework overseen by the government.

As part of his efforts to moderate Islamist influence, Mahathir successfully drew Anwar Ibrahim, leader of the Malaysian Islamic Youth Movement (ABIM), into UMNO. Mahathir's government also employed repressive measures against more extreme exponents of Islamism. In 1985, the Memali Incident occurred, resulting in a confrontation between police and followers of Islamist preacher Ibrahim Mahmud, known as Ibrahim Libya, in Kampung Memali, Baling, Kedah. This clash led to 18 deaths, including four police officers. Al-Arqam, a religious sect, was banned in 1994, and its leader, Ashaari Mohammad, was arrested under the Internal Security Act (ISA) due to the movement's deviation from Islamic principles and its perceived potential as a political threat.

Following rising racial tensions and political unrest, Operasi Lalang was launched in 1987. The government detained 119 individuals, including opposition politicians, activists, and intellectuals, under the Internal Security Act (ISA). These detentions, carried out without trial, were criticized by human rights groups.

Mahathir's party, the United Malays National Organisation (UMNO), entered a crisis in 1987. After Mahathir narrowly defeated Tengku Razaleigh Hamzah in the 1987 UMNO presidential election, Razaleigh's supporters claimed irregularities in the voting process and filed a lawsuit. In 1988, the High Court declared UMNO to be an unlawful society due to unregistered branches that violated the Societies Act 1966. This ruling effectively dissolved UMNO, leaving the party without legal status and creating uncertainty in its leadership. In response, Mahathir formed a new party, UMNO Baru (New UMNO), which most UMNO members joined. The reconstituted party later adopted the original name, UMNO. Meanwhile, Razaleigh and his supporters who refused to join UMNO Baru established Parti Melayu Semangat 46 in 1988. The situation escalated into a constitutional crisis when Mahathir's administration sought to assert greater control over the judiciary, suspending Salleh Abas, the Lord President of the Supreme Court, along with several senior judges, following Salleh's criticism of the government's attempts to influence judicial matters.

Mahathir also worked to resolve the long-standing insurgency by the Malayan Communist Party (MCP). Building on Malaysia's bilateral relations with China established in 1974, the Malaysian government encouraged Chinese leaders, including Deng Xiaoping, to influence the MCP to lay down their arms. By 1988, the MCP, weakened by diminishing support and the collapse of the communist bloc, agreed to peace negotiations mediated by Thailand. The talks culminated in the Hat Yai Peace Accord, signed on 2 December 1989, which required the MCP to cease militant activities, disband armed units, and pledge loyalty to the Yang di-Pertuan Agong.

The conclusion of the New Economic Policy (NEP) in 1990 led Mahathir to introduce Vision 2020, aiming to transform Malaysia into a fully developed nation by the year 2020. Achieving this objective required an average economic growth rate of seven percent per annum. The New Economic Policy (NEP) was succeeded by the National Development Policy (NDP) in 1991, which expanded certain government programs to include non-Bumiputera ethnic groups. By 1995, the NDP had contributed to poverty reduction, with fewer than nine percent of Malaysians living in poverty, and it had helped to narrow income inequality. The administration also reduced corporate taxes and liberalized financial regulations, attracting foreign investment and boosting economic growth rates to over nine percent annually until 1997.

Mahathir's second constitutional amendment in 1993 further curtailed royal privileges by removing the legal immunity of the royal family, allowing them to be prosecuted in a special court. This amendment reinforced the government's stance that all citizens, including royalty, should be subject to the rule of law.

Throughout the 1990s, Mahathir prioritized large-scale infrastructure projects. Among them was the development of the Multimedia Super Corridor, aimed at establishing Malaysia as a center for information technology. Other key projects included the creation of Putrajaya as the administrative capital and the establishment of the Formula One Grand Prix in Sepang. Among the more controversial was the Bakun Dam in Sarawak, a hydroelectric project intended to supply electricity across the South China Sea to Peninsular Malaysia. However, its construction was halted during the 1997 Asian financial crisis. The Petronas Twin Towers, completed in 1996, became an iconic symbol of Malaysia's rapid modernization. Mahathir envisioned the towers and the surrounding Kuala Lumpur City Centre (KLCC) as a global business hub, transforming Kuala Lumpur's skyline.

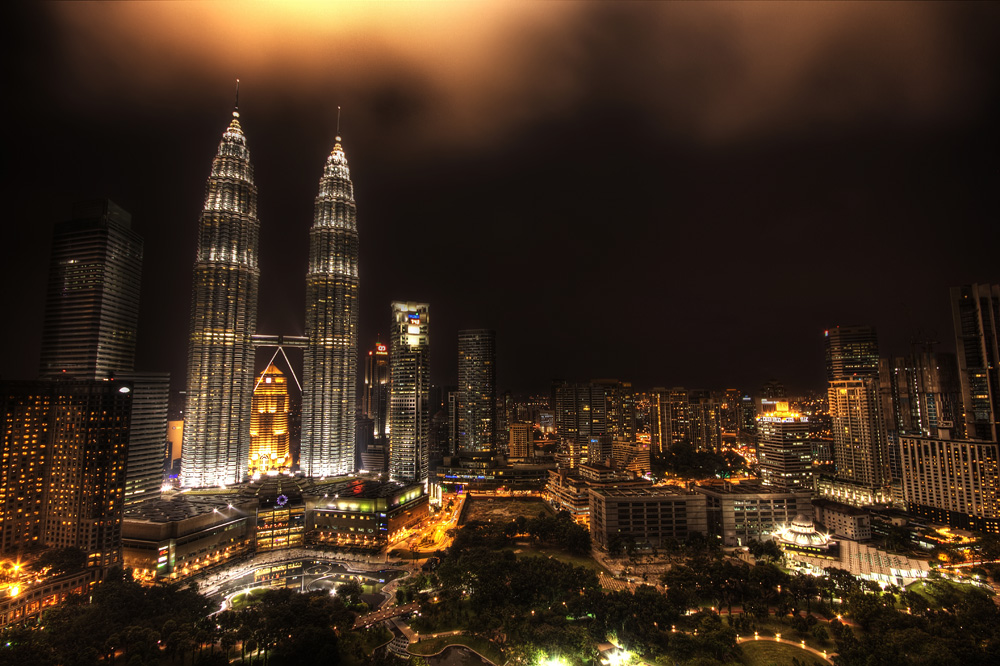
A view of Petronas Twin Towers and the surrounding central business district in Kuala Lumpur

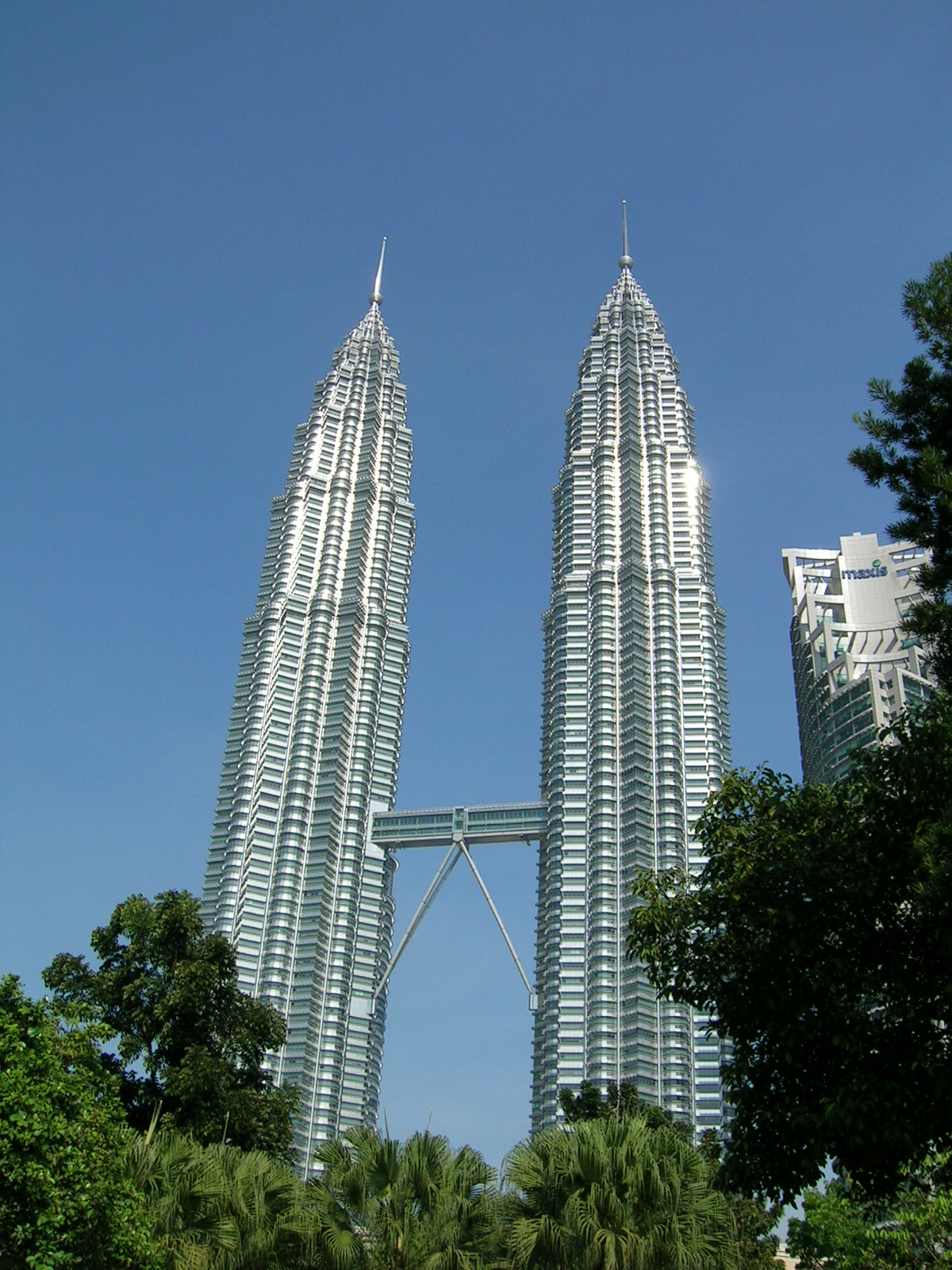
Petronas Twin Towers in Kuala Lumpur was the tallest building in Southeast Asia.

The 1997 Asian financial crisis significantly impacted Malaysia, with the Malaysian ringgit depreciating, foreign investment declining, and the stock market index dropping by over 75%. Initially following International Monetary Fund (IMF) recommendations, the government implemented spending cuts and raised interest rates, exacerbating economic strain. In 1998, Mahathir shifted policies by increasing government spending and pegging the ringgit to the US dollar, allowing Malaysia to recover faster than some neighboring countries.

The year 1998 also marked the dismissal of Deputy Prime Minister Anwar Ibrahim by Mahathir, leading to the Reformasi movement, which advocated for political reform and an end to corruption. Anwar's subsequent arrest and trial on charges of sodomy attracted widespread attention and criticism from international human rights organizations and fueled mass protests in Kuala Lumpur.

The Reformasi movement led to the formation of the National Justice Party (KeADILan), the predecessor to the People's Justice Party (PKR), in 1999, strengthening the opposition. The government responded with arrests and media restrictions, including curbs on PAS's Harakah newspaper. In the 1999 Malaysian general election, Barisan Nasional retained a two-thirds majority, though PAS and KeADILan made gains under the Alternative Front (BA) coalition.

In February 2003, Malaysia hosted the 13th Non-Aligned Movement Summit, where Mahathir condemned the United States' plans to invade Iraq as a violation of international law and urged NAM members to oppose unilateral military actions.

Although he had announced his retirement in June 2002 and named Abdullah Ahmad Badawi as his successor, Mahathir officially stepped down in October 2003 after over 22 years in office, making him the world's longest-serving elected leader at the time.

=== Abdullah administration ===
Abdullah Ahmad Badawi was sworn in as Malaysia's fifth prime minister on 31 October 2003, beginning his term with a pledge to combat corruption by strengthening anti-corruption agencies, expanding public channels for reporting corruption, and improving transparency in the award of government contracts. He promoted Islam Hadhari, an approach to Islam emphasizing compatibility between Islamic principles and economic and technological development. Aligning with this approach, his administration introduced the j-QAF programme in 2004 to strengthen Islamic education in schools. In the same year, he also introduced the National Integrity Plan and Malaysian Integrity Institute to foster ethical governance. Additionally, Abdullah's government sought to improve access to higher education and bolster Malaysia's standing as a regional educational hub, expanding funding and infrastructure for tertiary education.

Following the 2004 general election, Abdullah led the Barisan Nasional (BN) coalition to a major victory, securing over 90% of parliamentary seats. Later that year, the Indian Ocean tsunami affected parts of Malaysia, particularly Penang and Kedah, prompting Abdullah's administration to coordinate relief efforts and establish a tsunami warning system to improve disaster preparedness. In 2005, Malaysia hosted the inaugural East Asia Summit under Abdullah's leadership, aiming to enhance cooperation among Southeast Asian nations and major global powers.

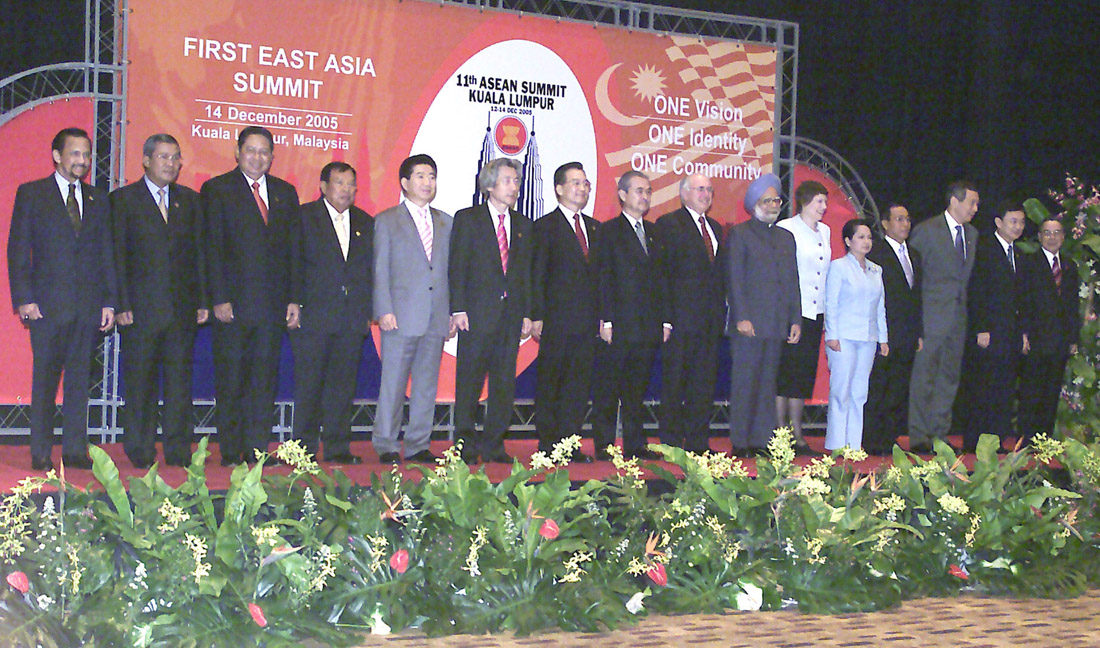
Malaysia hosted the first East Asia Summit in 2005, led by Prime Minister Abdullah Ahmad Badawi, to promote regional cooperation.

To advance economic development, Abdullah launched the Special Task Force to Facilitate Business (PEMUDAH) in 2007 to streamline business processes and reduce bureaucratic inefficiencies. Between 2006 and 2008, his administration introduced five economic corridors—Iskandar Malaysia, Northern Corridor Economic Region (NCER), East Coast Economic Region (ECER), Sabah Development Corridor (SDC), and Sarawak Corridor of Renewable Energy (SCORE)—to drive regional development.

The government sought to transition into a value-chain economy while maintaining its manufacturing base by revitalizing Malaysia's agriculture sector to enhance food security, incorporating modern agrotechnology and implementing a national food security plan in 2008 amid the world food price crisis at the time. Abdullah also faced criticism over rising petrol and electricity costs linked to subsidy restructuring, as these changes were seen as potentially undermining Malaysia's traditional advantage as an exporter.

Sheikh Muszaphar Shukor became Malaysia's first astronaut on 10 October 2007, travelling aboard the Russian Soyuz TMA-11, a milestone for Malaysia's space exploration program. That same year, two major anti-government rallies took place. The first Bersih Rally on 10 November in Kuala Lumpur called for electoral reform amid corruption allegations and criticisms of a system favouring Barisan Nasional. Later that month, on 25 November, the HINDRAF rally organised by the Hindu Rights Action Force (HINDRAF) protested perceived ethnic discrimination policies. The government subsequently banned HINDRAF in October 2008, labelling it a security threat.

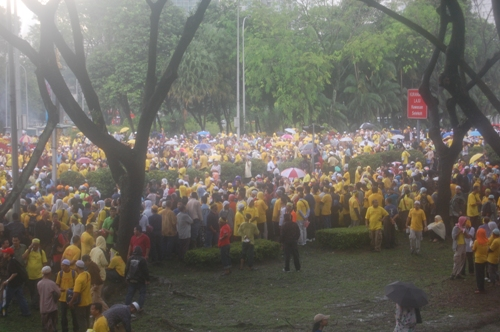
2007 Bersih rally that was held in Kuala Lumpur

The 2008 financial crisis led to reduced demand for Malaysian exports such as electronics, palm oil, and rubber, causing the country's GDP growth to slow significantly and contract in early 2009 before beginning a gradual recovery. To mitigate the impact, Abdullah's government introduced two stimulus packages totalling approximately RM67 billion, supporting domestic spending, infrastructure projects, and vulnerable sectors. These measures, alongside Malaysia's diversified economy, contributed to a relatively swift recovery. In 2009, his administration established the Malaysian Anti-Corruption Commission (MACC), replacing the Anti-Corruption Agency (ACA), to enhance anti-corruption efforts. That same year, his administration also established the Judicial Appointments Commission (JAC) to improve transparency in judicial appointments, strengthening judicial independence.

In the 2008 general election, Barisan Nasional lost its two-thirds majority for the first time since 1969, a result of the political tsunami brought about by the 2008 Malaysian Opposition Wave, which signaled a significant decline in public support. Mounting criticism over unmet anti-corruption promises and perceived ineffective leadership led Abdullah to announce his resignation in October 2008, with his departure finalised in April 2009 when Najib Razak took office as his successor.

=== Najib administration ===
Najib Razak was sworn in as Malaysia's sixth prime minister on 3 April 2009. Early in his tenure, he introduced the 1Malaysia campaign, a national unity initiative aimed at fostering ethnic harmony, service efficiency, and equitable opportunities. The concept expanded into a public service brand covering various social and economic policies aimed at unifying Malaysia's multicultural society.

On 15 September 2011, Najib announced plans to repeal the Internal Security Act 1960 (ISA), which had been criticised for allowing indefinite detention without trial. It was replaced by the Security Offences (Special Measures) Act 2012 (SOSMA), which came into effect on 31 July 2012. However, critics argued that SOSMA was misused to silence dissenting voices, with several activists detained under the law.

In early February 2013, an incursion occurred in Lahad Datu when hundreds of militants, some armed, arrived by boats in Lahad Datu District, Sabah, Malaysia, from Simunul Island, Tawi-Tawi, in the southern Philippines. The group was sent by Jamalul Kiram III, a claimant to the throne of the Sultanate of Sulu. In response, Malaysian security forces launched a major operation to repel the militants, resulting in a decisive Malaysian victory that concluded the conflict by late March 2013. Following this, the Eastern Sabah Security Command (ESSCOM) was established to enhance security along Sabah's eastern coast.

In the 2013 general election, Najib led the Barisan Nasional (BN) coalition to victory, retaining a majority in Parliament. However, the election was marred by allegations of electoral irregularities, including accusations of gerrymandering and alleged misuse of government resources. This led to widespread public protests, which demanded electoral reform.

On 8 March 2014, Malaysia Airlines Flight 370 disappeared en route from Kuala Lumpur to Beijing, leading to one of the largest and most costly search efforts in aviation history. All 227 passengers and 12 crew members are presumed dead. Four months later, on 17 July 2014, Malaysia Airlines Flight 17 was shot down by a surface-to-air missile over Eastern Ukraine while flying over territory controlled by Russian-backed militants, resulting in the deaths of all 298 passengers and crew on board.

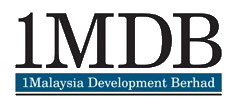
The 1MDB corruption scandal tainted the tenure of Prime Minister, Najib Razak.

On 1 April 2015, Najib's administration introduced a controversial 6% Goods and Services Tax (GST) on most goods and services to expand Malaysia's tax base. The GST was widely unpopular, with many Malaysians expressing concerns over rising living costs. Later that year, Najib's administration was engulfed in scandal when Najib and other officials were implicated in a multibillion-dollar embezzlement and money-laundering scheme involving 1Malaysia Development Berhad (1MDB), a state-owned investment fund allegedly masterminded by Taek Jho Low. This triggered widespread calls and protests from Malaysians, including opposition parties, demanding Najib's resignation. These protests culminated in the Malaysian Citizens' Declaration, a declaration from a coalition of political and civil leaders calling for Najib's removal from office.

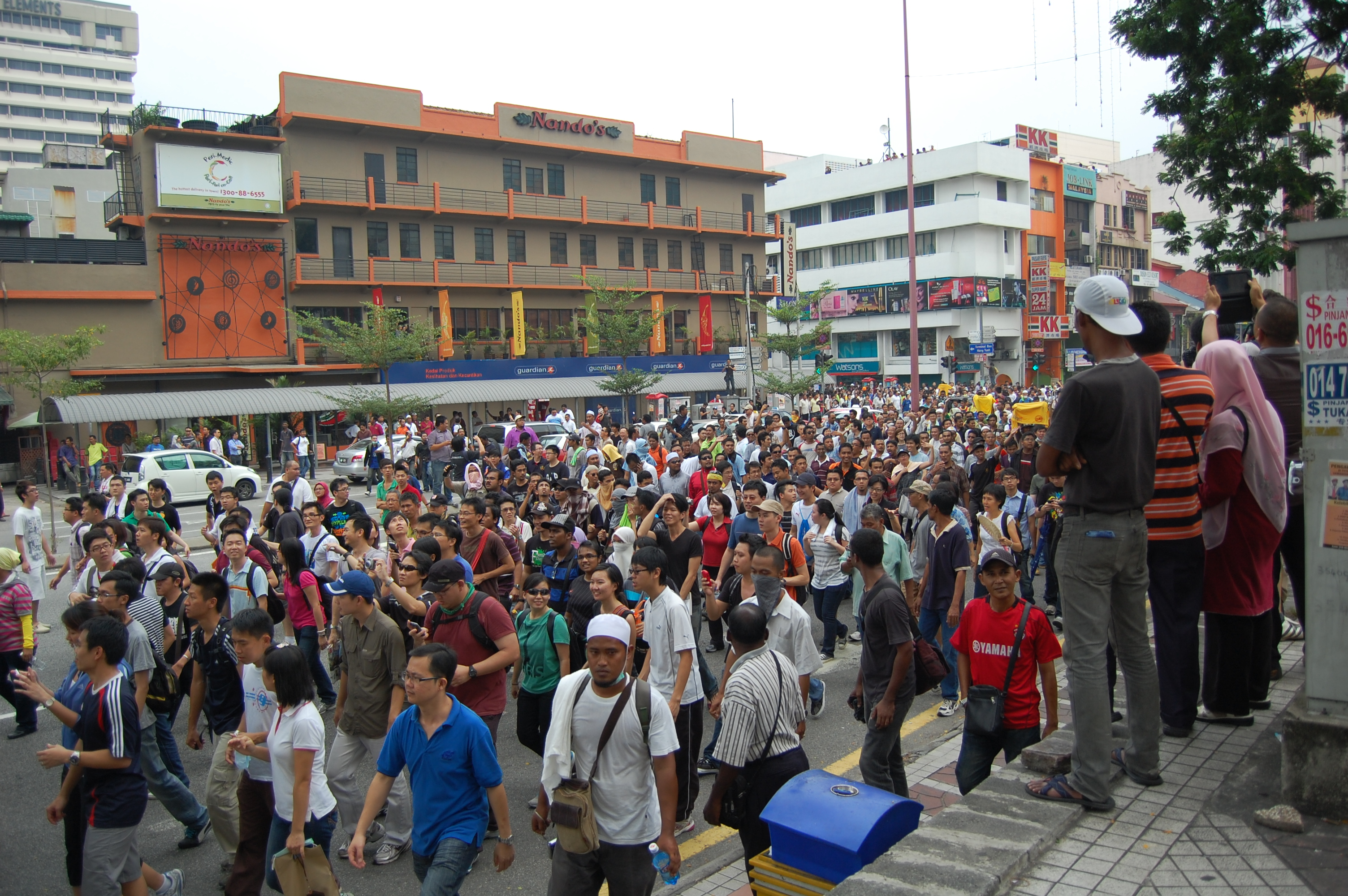
Bersih 2.0 rally protesters marching the streets of Kuala Lumpur peacefully before the police confronted them.

From 2011 to 2016, the Bersih movement held several large rallies calling for electoral reform, transparency, and accountability in governance. The Najib administration's response included arrests of activists and restrictions on media coverage, which garnered both domestic and international scrutiny. Amid growing dissent, Najib removed his then-deputy, Muhyiddin Yassin, suspended several newspapers, and enacted the National Security Council Act 2016, granting unprecedented powers to the prime minister. Additionally, living costs surged due to subsidy cuts, and the Malaysian ringgit experienced a sharp decline.

In 2017, diplomatic tensions flared between Malaysia and North Korea after the assassination of Kim Jong-nam in Malaysia, an incident that sparked a major diplomatic row and brought international media attention.

Najib's tenure ended after the 2018 general election, in which Barisan Nasional lost its parliamentary majority for the first time in Malaysia's history.

=== Second Mahathir administration ===
Mahathir Mohamad was sworn in as the seventh Prime Minister after winning the election on 10 May 2018. A number of issues contributed to Najib Razak's defeat, including the ongoing 1Malaysia Development Berhad (1MDB) scandal, the 6% Goods and Services Tax, and the rising cost of living.

Mahathir promised to "restore the rule of law" and conduct elaborate and transparent investigations into the 1Malaysia Development Berhad scandal.

Anwar Ibrahim was given a full royal pardon and was released from prison on 16 May 2018. He was designated to take over the reins from Prime Minister Mahathir Mohamad as planned and agreed by the coalition before GE14.

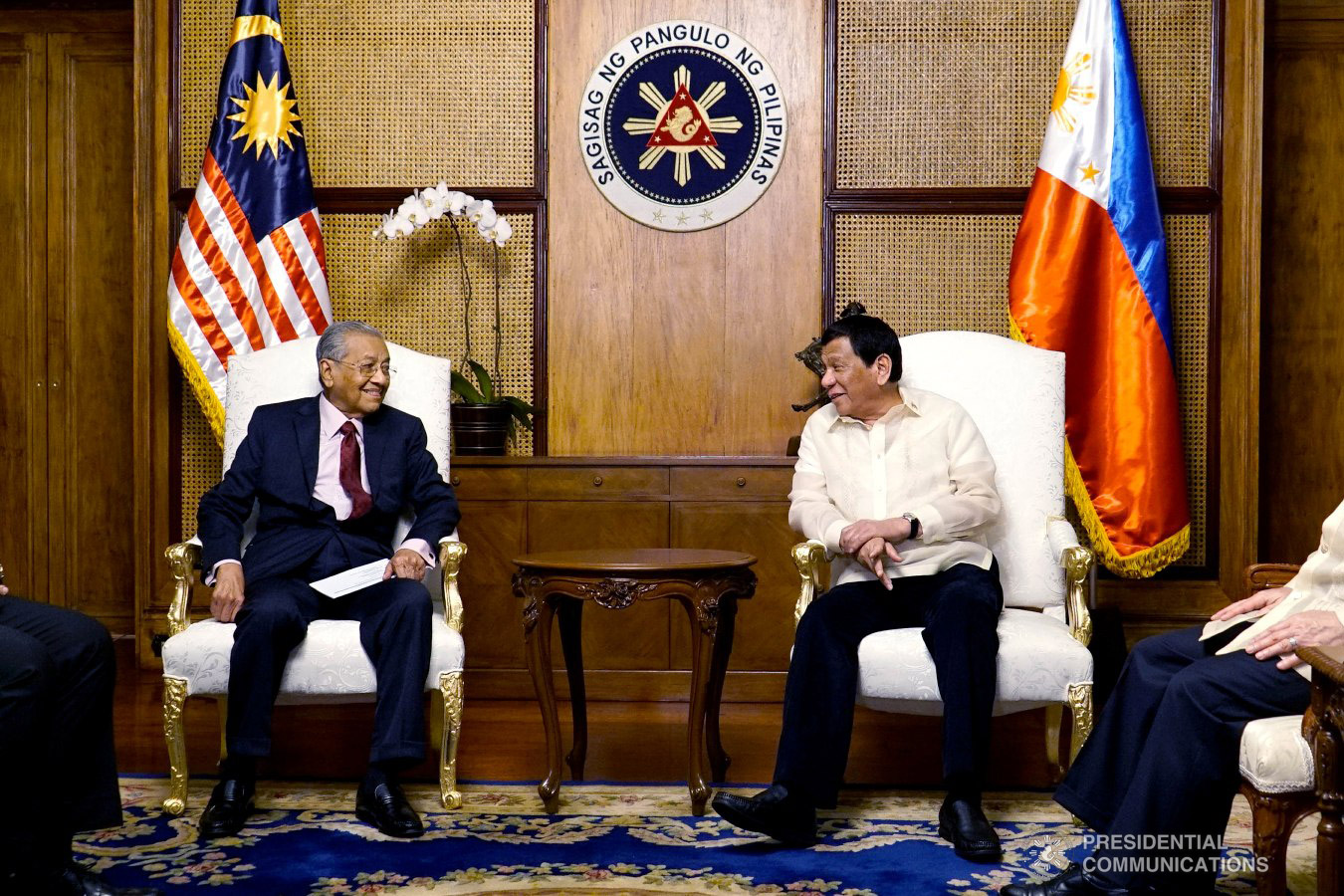
Philippine President Duterte in a meeting with Mahathir in the Malacanang Palace in 2019

The unpopular tax was reduced to 0% on 1 June 2018. The government under Mahathir tabled the first reading Bill to repeal GST in Parliament on 31 July 2018. GST was successfully replaced with Sales Tax and Service Tax starting 1 September 2018.

Mahathir's administration promised to review all Belt and Road Initiative projects in Malaysia that were initiated by the previous government. He characterised these as "unequal treaties" and said some were linked to misappropriated funds from the 1MDB scandal. The government suspended work on the East Coast Rail Link and continued it after terms had been renegotiated. Mahathir cancelled approximately $2.8 billion worth of deals with China Petroleum Pipeline Bureau, stating that Malaysia would not be able to repay its obligations to China.

Mahathir was supportive of the 2018–19 Korean peace process and announced that Malaysia would reopen its embassy in North Korea and resume relations.

On 28 September 2018, Mahathir addressed the United Nations General Assembly, stating that his government would promise to ratify the International Convention on the Elimination of All Forms of Racial Discrimination (ICERD). However, after weeks of receiving racially and religiously charged demonstrations against the convention, particularly from Bumiputras, the Pakatan Harapan government chose not to accede to the ICERD on 23 November 2018.

Mahathir announced the Shared Prosperity Vision 2030 in October 2019, which aimed to increase the incomes of all ethnic groups, focus more on the technology sector, and for Malaysia to become a high-income country by 2030. Malaysia's freedom of the press improved slightly under Mahathir's tenure, and the country's rank rose in the Press Freedom Index.

Political infighting within the Pakatan Harapan coalition, as well as the uncertainty of the date of the transition of power to his designated successor, Anwar Ibrahim, soon culminated in a political crisis known as the Sheraton Move in February 2020.

=== Muhyiddin administration ===
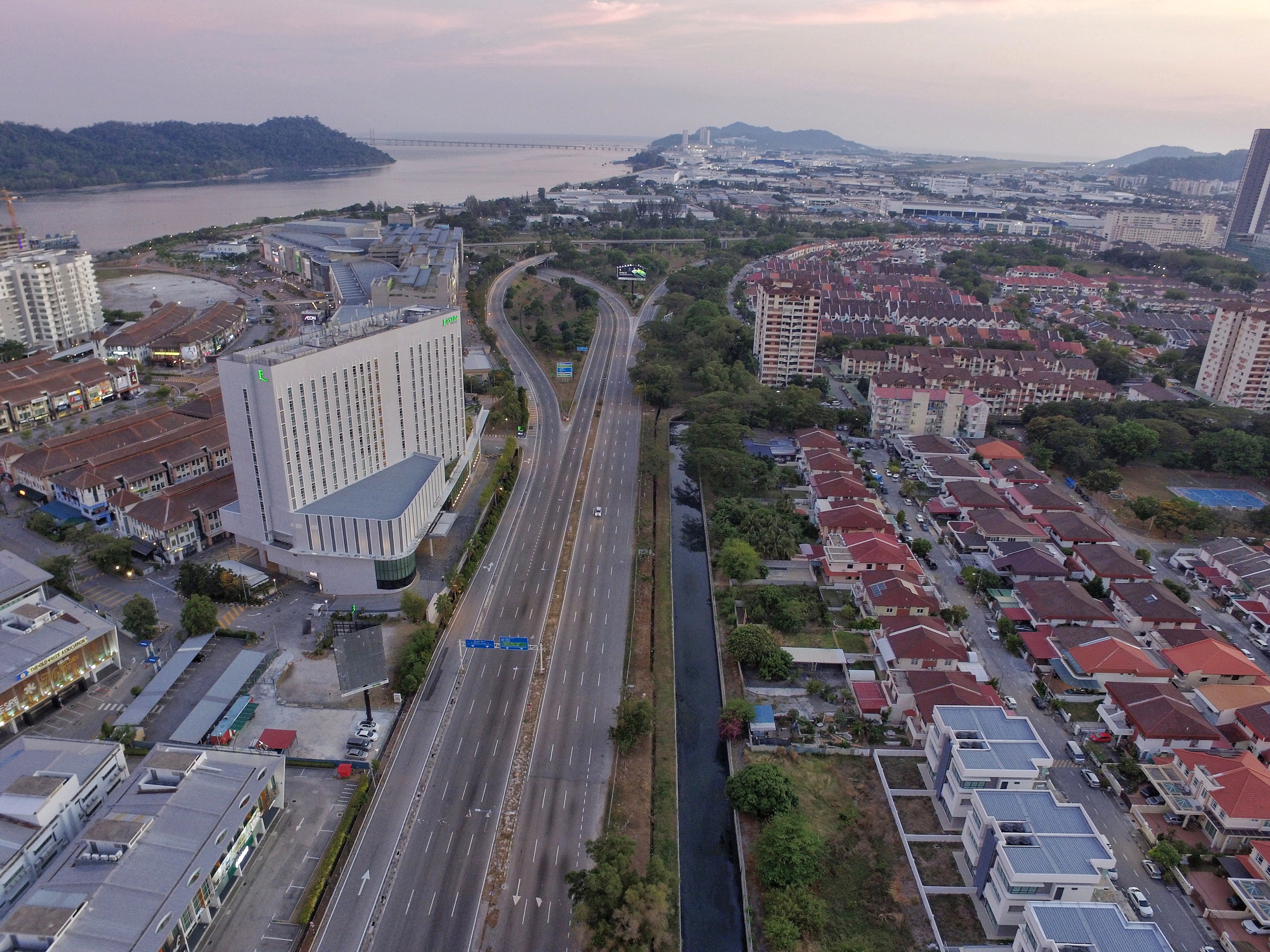
The usually crowded Lim Chong Eu Expressway and its surroundings in Penang were deserted on 22 March 2020 during the Malaysian Movement Control Order to combat the COVID-19 pandemic.

On 1 March 2020, a week after the country was thrown into a political crisis, Muhyiddin Yassin was appointed as the eighth Prime Minister by the Yang di-Pertuan Agong, following the abrupt resignation of Mahathir Mohamad. The fallen government was replaced by the new Perikatan Nasional (PN) coalition government, led by BERSATU leader Muhyiddin.

During his administration, COVID-19 spread throughout the nation. In response, Muhyiddin implemented the Malaysian movement control order (MCO) on 18 March 2020.

On 28 July 2020, the High Court convicted former Prime Minister Najib Razak of abuse of power, money laundering and criminal breach of trust, becoming the first Prime Minister of Malaysia to be convicted of corruption. After failing several appeals, he entered Kajang Prison on August 23, 2022, to serve his sentence.

In mid-January 2021, the Yang di-Pertuan Agong declared a national state of emergency until at least 1 August in response to the COVID-19 crisis and political infighting. Parliament and elections were suspended while the Malaysian government was empowered to introduce laws without approval.

Muhyiddin commenced the country's vaccination programme against COVID-19 in late February 2021.

On 19 March 2021, North Korea announced the severance of diplomatic ties with Malaysia after the Kuala Lumpur High Court rejected the final appeal of North Korean businessman Mun Chol Myong against his extradition to the United States on money laundering and sanctions violation charges.

Muhyiddin officially resigned as prime minister on August 16, 2021, after losing the majority in parliament support due to the country's political crisis, as well as calls for his resignation due to economic stagnation and the government's failure to prevent COVID-19 infections and deaths. He was afterwards appointed back as caretaker prime minister by the Yang di-Pertuan Agong until a replacement can be selected.

=== Ismail Sabri administration ===
Ismail Sabri Yaakob was sworn in as the ninth Prime Minister on August 21, 2021. During his inaugural speech as prime minister on 22 August 2021, Ismail Sabri introduced the Keluarga Malaysia idea. During his tenure, he lifted the Movement Control Order (MCO) following the expansion of the vaccination programme and oversaw the Twelfth Malaysia Plan.

The Constitution (Amendment) Act 2022 was passed, restoring Sabah and Sarawak as equal partners to Peninsular Malaysia per the Malaysia Agreement of 1963, effective from 11 February 2022. Later in the same year, a constitutional amendment prohibiting members of parliament from switching political parties was also passed. Several UMNO lawmakers called for a snap election before the end of 2022 to resolve ongoing infighting in the party and obtain a stronger mandate. This led to an earlier general election in November 2022, which resulted in a hung parliament, the first federal election to have such a result in the nation's history.

=== Anwar administration ===
Anwar Ibrahim, the chairman of Pakatan Harapan (PH), was appointed and sworn in as the 10th Prime Minister of Malaysia on 24 November 2022 by the Yang di-Pertuan Agong, after securing support for a grand coalition government, thereby ending the nation's political crisis. He launched the Malaysia Madani concept as a national policy on January 19, 2023, in Putrajaya which replaced the Keluarga Malaysia concept from the previous administration of Ismail Sabri Yaakob.

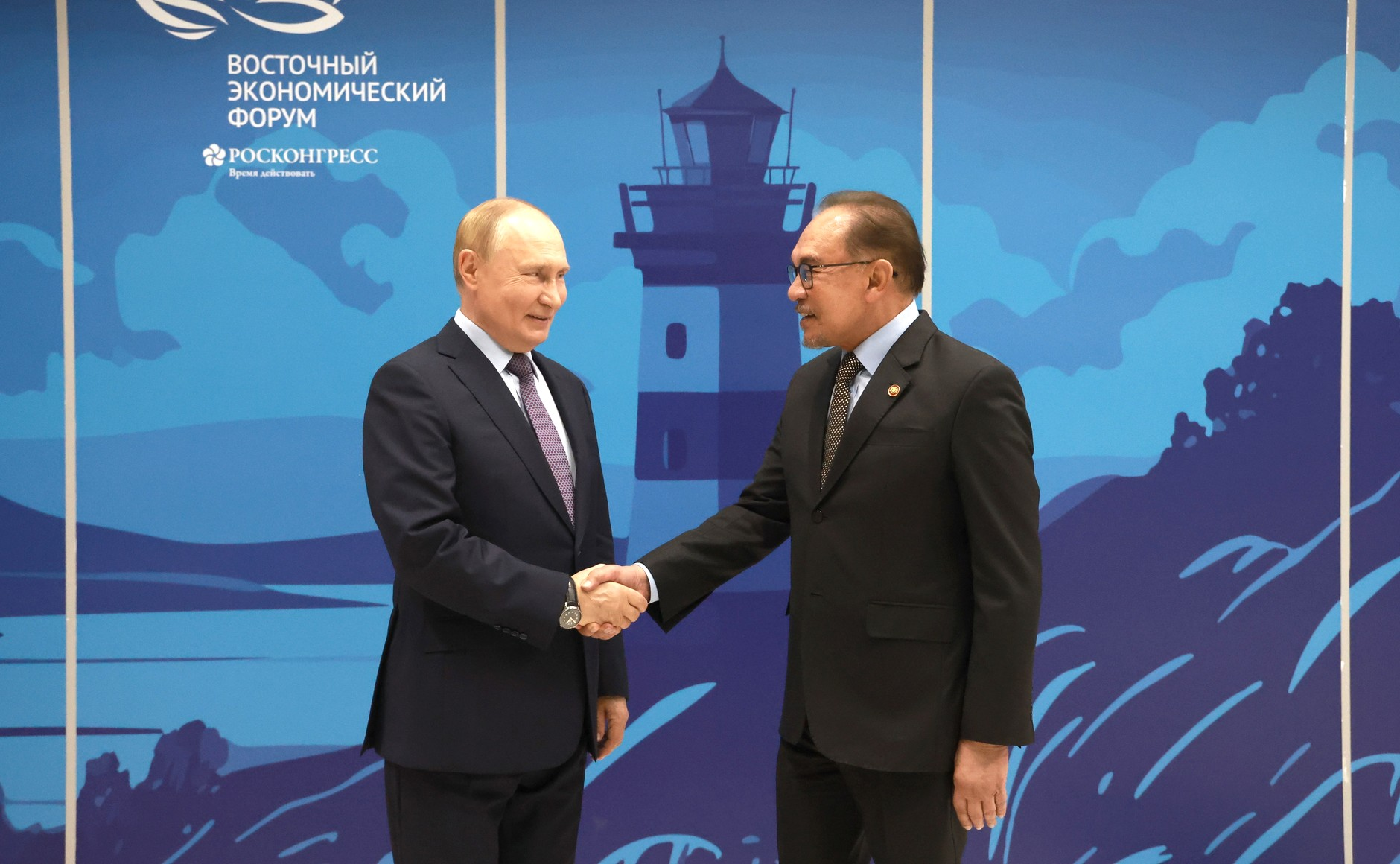
Anwar with Russian President Vladimir Putin at the Eastern Economic Forum in Primorsky Krai, Russia, 4 September 2024

On June 18, 2024, Anwar announced Malaysia's intention to join BRICS, emphasizing that this decision would not impact domestic politics. Malaysia officially submitted its application in July 2024. Anwar attended the 9th Eastern Economic Forum in Vladivostok, Russia, in September, where Russian President Vladimir Putin invited Malaysia to the upcoming BRICS Summit. On October 24, 2024, Malaysia, represented by Economy Minister Rafizi Ramli, attended the 16th BRICS Summit and formally attained BRICS partner country status on January 1, 2025, enhancing its economic and trade collaborations with BRICS nations.

== See also ==
- The formation of Malaysia
- History of Brunei
- History of the Philippines
- History of Singapore
- History of Southeast Asia
- Japanese occupation of British Borneo
- Japanese occupation of Malaya
