= Family tree of Johorean monarchs =

The following is family tree of the Malay monarchs of Johor, from the establishment of the Old Johor Sultanate in 1528 to the present day.

== House of Melaka-Johor ==
House of Melaka-Johor

House of Melaka-Pahang
Raja Ahmad
♀ a lady consort	Abdul Jalil II^{(4)} r. 1571–1597	♀ Raja Fatimah
Alauddin III^{(5)} r. 1597–1615	Abdul Jalil I^{(3)} r. 1570–1571
Abdul Jalil III^{(7)} r. 1623–1677

House of Melaka
Old Johor
Alauddin II^{(1)} r. 1528–1564
Muzaffar II^{(2)} r. 1564–1570
Abdullah^{(6)} r. 1615–1623
Raja Bajau; Yamtuan Muda of Pahang r. 1641–1676
Ibrahim^{(8)} r. 1677–1685
Mahmud II^{(9)} r. 1685–1699

== House of Bendahara-Johor ==
House of Bendahara-Johor

House of Bendahara
Tun Habib; Abdul Majid; B.S.M r. 1677–1697
Abdul Jalil IV^{(10)} r. 1699–1718
Tun Abbas; B.S.M r. 1722–1736	Sulaiman^{(11)} r. 1722–1760
Tun; Abdul Jamal; T.P.R r. 1757–1803	Abdul Jalil V^{(12)} r. 1760–1761
House of Temenggung	Mahmud III^{(14)} r. 1761–1812	Ahmad^{(13)} r. 1761–1770
Riau-Lingga
Hussein^{(15)} r. 1819–1835	Abdul Rahman^{(1)} r. 1812–1819
Muhammad^{(2)} r. 1832–1841
Ali^{(16)} r. 1835–1855	Mahmud IV^{(3)} r. 1841–1857	Sulaiman II^{(4)} r. 1857–1883

== House of Temenggong-Johor ==
House of Temenggong

House of Bendahara-Johor	Daeng Parani
Tun; Abdul Jamal; T.P.R r. 1757–1803	♀ Daeng; Maimuna
Tun Engku; Muhammad; Engku Muda	Tun; Abdul Hamid; T.S.M r. 1803–1806
Ungku; Abdul Rahman; T.S.M r. 1806–1825
Tun; Haji Abdullah; T.S.M r. 1825–1841	Tun; Daeng Ibrahim; T.S.M r. 1841–1862
Modern Johor
Abu Bakar; T.S.M r. 1862–1868; Maharaja r. 1868–1886; Sultan^{(1)} r. 1886–1895
Ibrahim^{(2)} r. 1895–1959
Ismail^{(3)} r. 1959–1981
Iskandar^{(4)} r. 1981–2010; YDP Agong VIII r. 1984–1989
House of Siak-Perak	House of Bendahara-Pahang
Raja Zarith Sofiah; Permaisuri Johor r. 2010–present Raja Permaisuri Agong XVII r. 2024–present	Ibrahim (II)^{(5)} r. 2010–present YDP Agong XVII r. 2024–present	Tunku Azizah Aminah; Maimunah Iskandariah; Tengku Ampuan Pahang r. 2019–present Raja Permaisuri Agong XVI r. 2019–2024	Abdullah; Sultan Pahang r. 2019–present YDP Agong XVI r. 2019–2024
Tunku Ismail; Tunku Mahkota Johor
Tunku Iskandar; Raja Muda Johor

== Bibliography ==
- Ahmad Sarji Abdul Hamid (2011), The Encyclopedia of Malaysia, vol. 16 - The Rulers of Malaysia, Editions Didier Millet, ISBN 978-981-3018-54-9
- Buyong Adil (1980), Sejarah Johor (History of Johor), Dewan Bahasa dan Pustaka.
- Trocki, Carl A. (2007), Prince of Pirates: The Temenggongs and the Development of Johor and Singapore, 1784–1885, National University of Singapore Press, ISBN 978-997-1693-76-3
- Yusoff Iskandar; Aruna Gopinath (1992), Tradisi Persejarahan Pahang Darul Makmur, 1800–1930 (Historisation tradition of Pahang Darul Makmur, 1800–1930), Tempo Publications (M), ISBN 978-9-6721-6590-3
