= Siege of Johor (1587) =

Successful Portuguese siege on Johor

- Part of Malay–Portuguese conflicts
Date	July–August 1587
Location	Johor Lama, Kota Tinggi
Result	Portuguese victory, city sacked

Belligerents
Portuguese Empire	Sultanate of Johor

Commanders and leaders
Dom Paulo de Lima	Ali Jalla Abdul Jalil Shah II of Johor

Casualties and losses
80 dead	7,000 dead 2,200 vessels captured 1,000 cannons captured 1,500 muskets captured

The siege of Johor of 1587 was a military operation in which Portuguese forces successfully sieged, sacked, and razed Johor, capital of its eponymous sultanate. The city would later be rebuilt at a different location.

In 1586 naval forces of Johor began diverting shipping to the Singapore Strait due to a lack of personnel available in Malacca. Malacca itself was threatened by a large Johor fleet, but it was driven back by the presence of heavily armed Portuguese galleons in its harbour.

== See also ==
- Portuguese Malacca
- Battle of Ugentana
- Battle of Ugentana (1536)
- Siege of Malacca (1568)
