= Battle of Ugentana (1536) =

Successful Portuguese attack on Ugentana in 1536

Second Battle of Ugentana
- Part of Malay–Portuguese conflicts
Date	1536
Location	Johor River, Malay Peninsula (today Kota Tinggi District)
Result	Portuguese victory

Belligerents
Portuguese Empire	Sultanate of Johor

Commanders and leaders
Dom Estevão da Gama	Alauddin Riayat Shah II of Johor

Strength
1 carrack, light oarvessels 400 Portuguese soldiers 400 Malay auxiliaries Unrecorded number of slave gunners	5,000 men 40 oarvessels

Casualties and losses
3 dead	500 dead

The Second Battle of Ugentana, was a military operation that took place in 1536, between Portuguese forces and those of Sultan Alauddin Riayat Shah II of Johor.

== The Battle ==
In 1535, the Portuguese captain of Malacca Dom Estevão da Gama attempted to defeat the Sultan of Johor by attacking his capital at Ugentana. Although he burned the city, the sultan avoided the total destruction of his forces by evacuating the city and retreating with his army into the jungle, while most of his fleet was out at sea at the time. Hence, he was able to rebuild his city and continue harassing the navigation of Malacca after the Portuguese had left, and for that reason Dom Estevão was compelled to try and attack Ugentana once more. He departed from Malacca with a carrack, a number of light oarships, 400 Portuguese soldiers, 400 auxiliaries and an unrecorded number of combat slaves with arquebuses.

The Portuguese fleet went through a storm sailing into the Singapore Strait, which sank Dom Estevão's galley. Having sailed up the Johor River, the Portuguese learned that the sultan had constructed a new stockade where a stone fort they destroyed the previous year had once stood, garrisoned by 5,000 men, a short distance from his capital. However, the sultan's forces were considerably weakened because the Portuguese had captured large amounts of artillery the previous year. Dom Estevão landed his men and attacked the stockade by land, the Portuguese sailors, Malay auxiliaries and slaves hurled clay bombs, which lit fires and threw the defenders into confusion. The soldiers then stormed it and captured it after a brief fight.

The Portuguese managed to capture the sultan's fleet, numbering 40 lancharas that were beached at that location. The sultan witnessed the battle from atop an elephant, and again attempted to evacuate into the jungle, but he suffered a revolt and his baggage train carrying his treasure was assaulted mid-retreat by his own fleeing forces. Under these conditions, he sought terms with the Portuguese, but Dom Estevão only agreed to sign a peace treaty after the sultan provided his uncle as a hostage.

With the capture of the Johor fleet, navigation in the Singapore Strait became much safer and trade increased.

== See also ==
- Portuguese Malacca
- Capture of Malacca (1511)
- Siege of Bintan
- Battle of Ugentana
- Siege of Johor (1587)
