= Malay–Portuguese conflicts =

1509–1641 series of military engagements

- Part of Portuguese presence in Asia
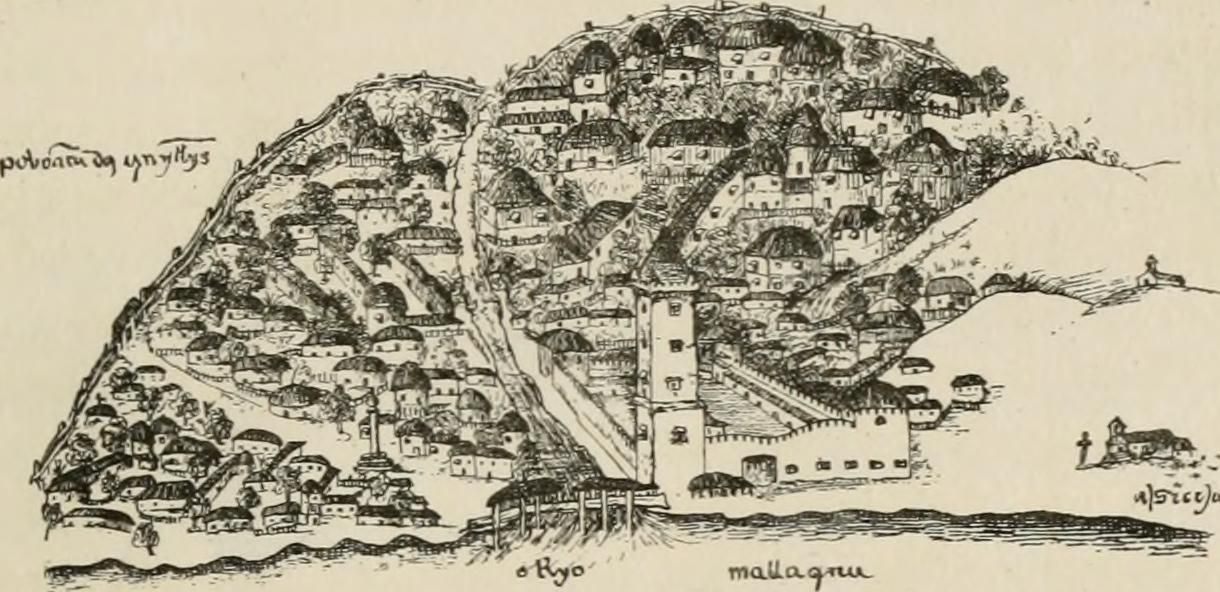
- Portuguese sketch of Malacca c. 1550 to 1563.
Date	1509–1641 (132 years)
Location	The Malay Peninsula, Strait of Malacca
Result	Establishment of Portuguese Malacca; Disestablishment of the Sultanate of Malacca; Establishment of Johor Sultanate; Establishment of the Sultanate of Perak; Disestablishment of Portuguese Malacca; Establishment of Dutch Malacca

Belligerents
Portuguese Empire; Perak Sultanate; Kedah Sultanate	Malacca Sultanate; Johor Sultanate; Pahang Sultanate; Patani Kingdom; Demak Sultanate; Kalinyamat Sultanate; (Dutch East India Company) Dutch Republic

Commanders and leaders
Diogo Lopes de Sequeira; Afonso de Albuquerque; Garcia de Sá; António Correia; Jorge de Albuquerque; Martim Afonso de Sousa; Álvaro de Brito; Dom Pedro Mascarenhas; Dom Estevão da Gama; Dom Paulo de Lima; André Furtado de Mendonça; Manuel de Sousa Coutinho	Mahmud Shah of Malacca; Alauddin Riayat Shah II of Johor; Muzaffar II of Johor; Abdul Jalil I of Johor; Ali Jalla Abdul Jalil Shah II of Johor; Alauddin Riayat Shah III of Johor; Abdullah Ma'ayat Shah of Johor; Abdul Jalil Shah III of Johor; Pati Unus; Ratu Kalinyamat; (Dutch East India Company) Cornelis Matelief de Jonge; (Dutch East India Company) Adriaen Antonisz; (Dutch East India Company) Jakob Cooper; (Dutch East India Company) Minne Williemsz Caertekoe

The Malay–Portuguese conflicts were military engagements between the forces of the Portuguese Empire and the various Malay states and dynasties, fought intermittently from 1509 to 1641 in the Malay Peninsula and Strait of Malacca.

== Background ==
In 1498, after decades of exploratory efforts, the Portuguese navigator Vasco da Gama reached India, landing at Calicut. He returned to Lisbon in 1499, ushering a new age of European presence in the East.

King Manuel wished to become involved in the Indian Ocean trade network, expecting to derive great profits from importing spices to Europe via the Cape Route, bypassing the numerous middle-men that traded in valuable merchandise through the Red Sea, Egypt and the Middle East, where they were acquired by Venetian merchants and sold in Europe.

The existence of the wealthy trade hub of Malacca was known to King Manuel of Portugal since at least 1505, from second-hand information collected by captains in India. The port city of Malacca controlled the narrow, strategic Strait of Malacca, through which all seagoing trade between China and India was concentrated. He dispatched a trade mission under the command of Diogo Lopes de Sequeira, tasked with making contact with the city and establish friendly trade relations.

== War against Sultan Mahmud 1509–1526 ==
=== Battle of Malacca 1509 ===
Diogo Lopes de Sequeira successfully reached the city and was warmly welcomed by the local sultan Mahmud Shah, who granted the Portuguese commander authorization to establish a feitoria or trade post. Wary of their interests, the influential Muslim merchant community of the city conspired with the Sultan and convinced him to turn on the Portuguese.

The Portuguese ships lying in the harbour were unexpectedly attacked by the Malaccan fleet, and Sequeira returned to India, leaving behind a number of Portuguese who were captured, imprisoned, and tortured.

=== Portuguese Conquest of Malacca 1511 ===
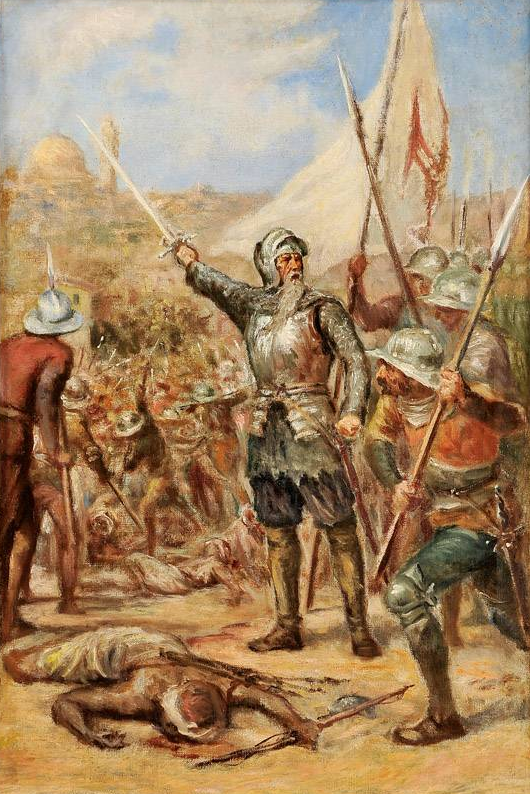
Portuguese Conquest of Malacca, by Ernesto Condeixa (1858–1933)

The Portuguese, left behind by Sequeira at Malacca were headed by the factor Rui de Araújo, who slipped letters to the governor of Portuguese India Afonso de Albuquerque from prison with the aid of Nina Chatu, a dissatisfied Hindu merchant.

Albuquerque subsequently led an expedition of 16 ships, 700 Portuguese soldiers and 300 Malabarese auxiliaries that succeeded in wresting the city from the unpopular Sultan Mahmud, with the support of part of its population, after a military operation that lasted two months from July 1 to September 1. Albuquerque subsequently built a fort, established various institutions in the city, and confirmed religious freedom to its inhabitants. Malacca became a stepping stone for future Portuguese endeavours in the region and beyond, whether exploratory, diplomatical or commercial. At dawn of 25 July 1511 the Portuguese attacked the town concentrating the assault on the Upeh bridge of the river dividing the town. After a fierce battle the bridge was conquered by the Portuguese, but at nightfall they retreated. After some days of preparations the Portuguese renewed the attack on 10 August 1511.

The capture of Malacca was the result of King Manuel plan to beat the Castilians to the Far East, and Albuquerque's own plan of establishing firm foundations for Portuguese India, alongside Hormuz, Goa and Aden, to ultimately control trade and thwart Muslim shipping in the Indian Ocean. The Portuguese conquest of Malacca was a watershed event that led to the reshaping of the Southeast Asia.

=== Sumatra campaigns 1515 ===
Around June 1515, Jorge Botelho with 11 oarships, 100 Portuguese soldiers and 500 Malay auxiliaries routed a fleet of the sultan of Lingga –a vassal of Sultan Mahmud– in the Kampar River, who had been besieging Kampar, which was an ally of the Portuguese. The entire fleet of Lingga numbering 80 lancharas was captured and then gifted to the Sultan of Kampar.

Having gotten information that Sultan Mahmud was about to dispatch a fleet to attack Portuguese vessels trading at Minangkabau, the captain of Malacca Jorge de Albuquerque dispatched Francisco de Melo with 9 oarvessels and 100 Portuguese soldiers to protect them. At Siak River they routed 24 lancharas of Sultan Mahmud just as it split to go around a riverine island.

=== Battle of Pago 1520 ===
Following the capture of Malacca, Sultan Mahmud built a fortified camp at Pago, from where he harassed Malacca, expecting to retake the city at a later date.

With reinforcements sent from Goa, the captain of Malacca Garcia de Sá was able to force all of Mahmuds men in the vicinity of Malacca. António Corria then successfully assaulted Sultan Mahmuds camp at Pago with 150 Portuguese and 300 Malay auxiliaries on a small flotilla of 2 carracks, 1 caravel, 2-4 galliots and a number of native Malay lancharas, forcing him to withdraw to Pahang, and from there to the Bintan, an island-kingdom which he usurped.

=== Battle of Bintan 1521 ===
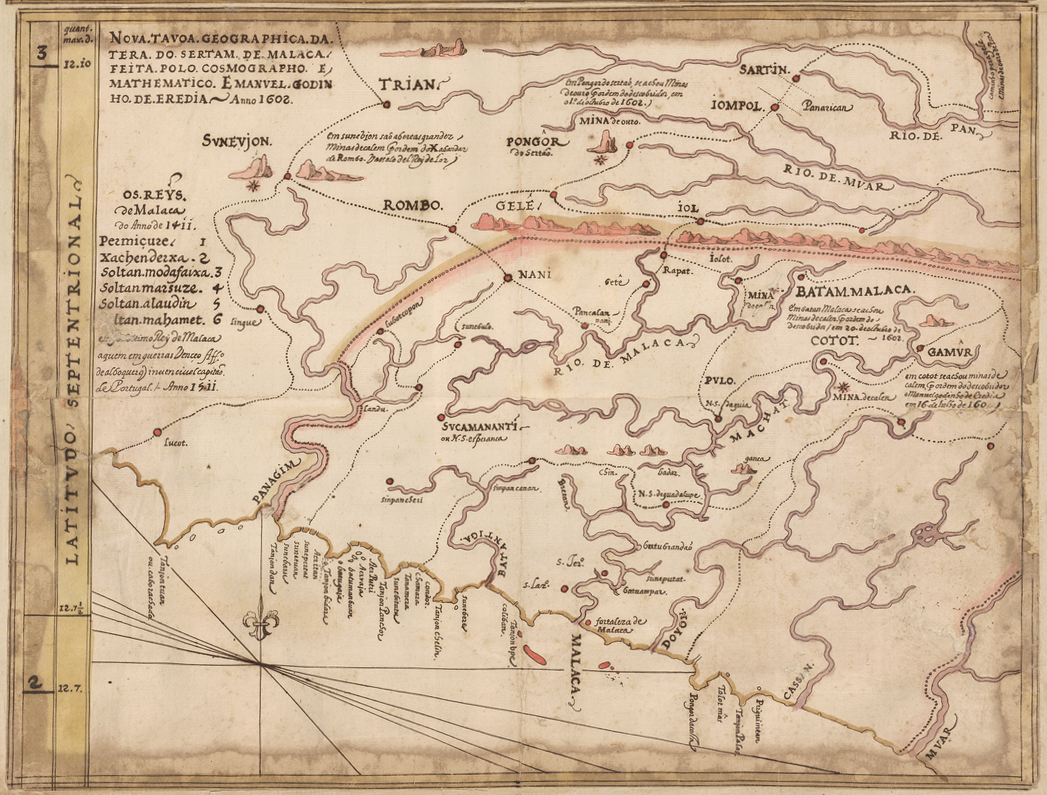
Portuguese map of the region of Malacca.

In 1521 the captain of Malacca Jorge de Albuquerque attacked Bintan with 18 ships and 600 men. Due to a lack of familiarity of the geography of the region, particularly its shallow waters, the Portuguese withdrew after losing 20 men and one light oarship. Afterwards, Sultan Mahmud's raids on Malaccan shipping increased.

=== First Battle of Pahang 1522 ===
Following the marriage alliance established in the same year between Sultan Mahmud and the deposed Sultan of Malacca, Mahmud Shah of Bintan. Ignorant of this development, Albuquerque sent three ships to the port of Pahang for provisions, where two of his captains and 30 men were killed. The third escaped, but was destroyed with all his men at Java. Simon Abreu and his crew were slain on another occasion.

=== Second Battle of Pahang 1522 ===
In 1522 a Portuguese fleet under the command of Antonio de Pina and his assistant Bernaldo Drago, who had landed at Pahang port, in ignorance that the Sultan there was a son-in-law of Sultan Mahmud of Bintan, were ambushed and killed. The captured survivors were sent to Bintan and forced to embrace Islam, while those who refused were executed via gunfire.

=== Battle of Muar River 1523 ===
Portuguese naval and war banner featuring the cross of the Order of Christ, used in the 16th and 17th century.

In early 1523, the Sultan of Malacca and the Sultan of the Pahang Sultanate established a base within Muar River, from which they raided the naval supply lines of the Portuguese at Malacca.

The captain of Malacca Jorge de Albuquerque detached a flotilla to face the Malays within the river and disperse them in April, however a heavy storm scattered the ships of the Portuguese, and three were ambushed with 65 soldiers being killed upon entering into Muar. The Malays then withdrew.

=== Siege of Malacca 1524 ===
Sultan Mahmud besieged Malacca in May with a fleet of 80 oarships and 16,000 men led by a Portuguese renegade. The Portuguese garrison numbered 200 soldiers supported by the corps of native Malay auxiliaries and after a month the attackers withdrew to Bintan, shortly before the arrival of Portuguese reinforcements.

=== Third Battle of Pahang 1524 ===
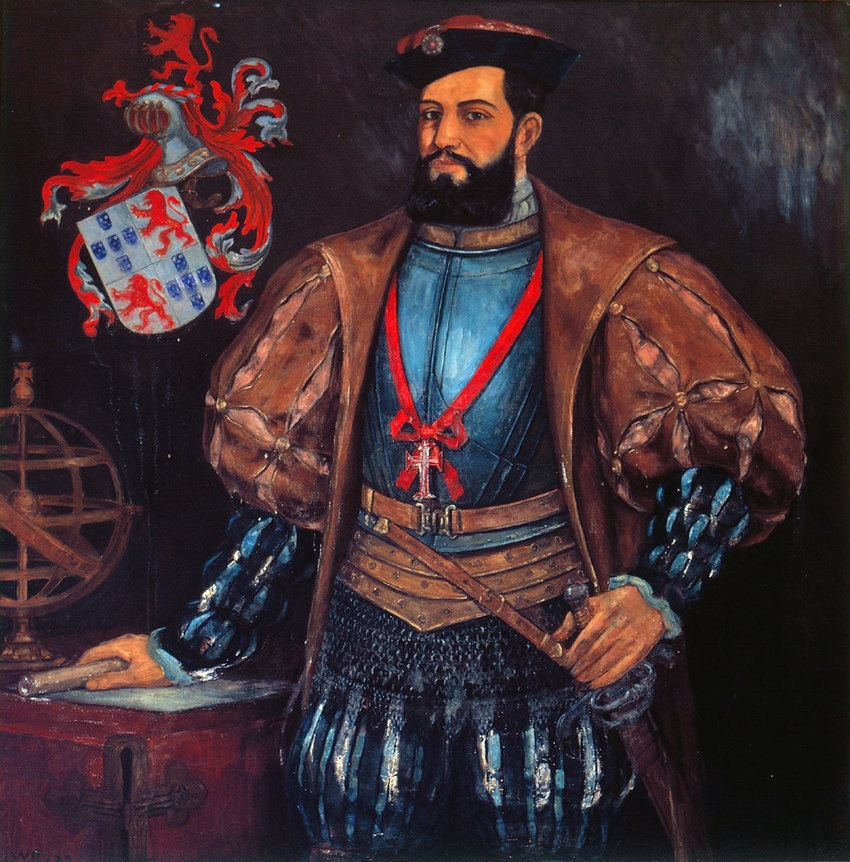
Martim Afonso de Sousa.

After having arrived at Malacca with reinforcements, Martim Afonso de Sousa relieved the city, and pursued the admiral of Malacca into Bintan, which he blockaded for three months. Thence he proceeded to Pahang, destroyed all the vessels in the river and slew over six hundred people in retaliation for the assistance given to the Sultan of Malacca. Numbers were carried into slavery.

=== Battle of Patani 1524 ===
In June 1524, Martim Afonso de Sousa destroyed 36 junks at anchor at Patani, which had allied with Pahang and Bintan, and torched the city, including the surrounding dusun cropfields, orchards and palm groves. During the next two weeks he captured or destroyed another 70 junks arriving from Siam or Java. The following year, a peace between Patani and Portugal was achieved by the new captain of Malacca, Pedro de Mascarenhas (1525–1526), who had dispatched a mission to Pahang led by Martim Afonso de Melo Jusarte.

=== Battle of Lingga 1525 ===
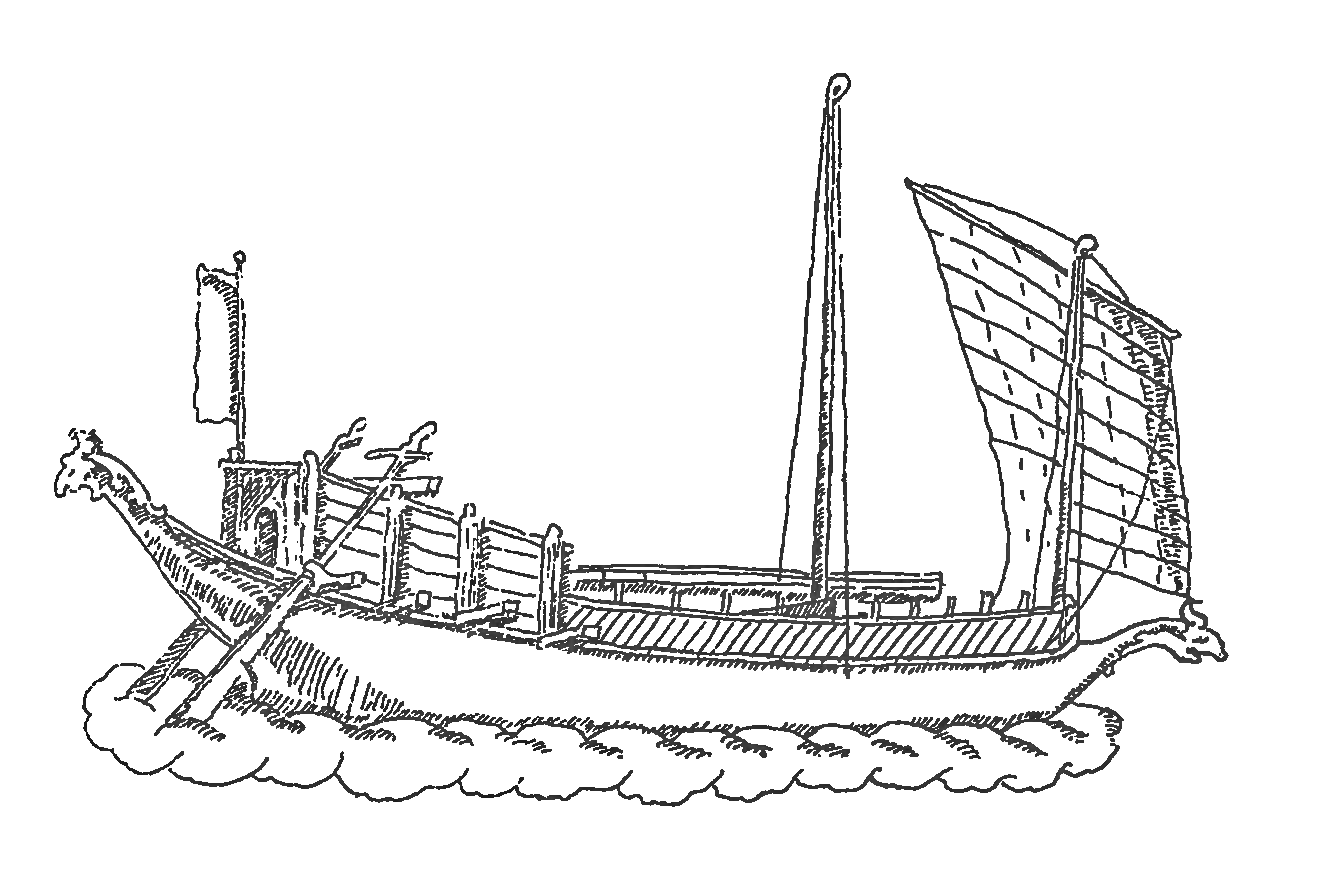
Portuguese illustration of a Malay lanchara.

In 1525, two Portuguese carracks and 80 soldiers under the command of Álvaro de Brito and António Raposo came to the aid of an allied ruler, the Sultan of Lingga and repulsed a larger joint fleet of Sultan Mahmud and the Sultan of Indragiri, numbering 160 lancharas and 2,000 men, close to the Ligga archipelago.

=== Siege of Bintan 1526 ===
Taking advantage of the unusually large numbers of soldiers available in Malacca, captain Dom Pedro Mascarenhas decided to undertake a vigorous campaign on Bintan and neutralize Sultan Mahmud once and for all.

With 15 ships, 600 Portuguese soldiers, 300 Malay auxiliaries and an unrecorded number of sailors and combat-slaves, Dom Pedro blockaded the island-kingdom of Bintan and laid siege to its capital city. Despite the difficult terrain which favoured defense and Sultan Mahmud having aid from the Sultan of Pahang, the outnumbered Portuguese overcame every ordeal and assaulted the city by surprise one night, driving away all defenders. Bintan was razed and the territory was returned to its previous ruler.

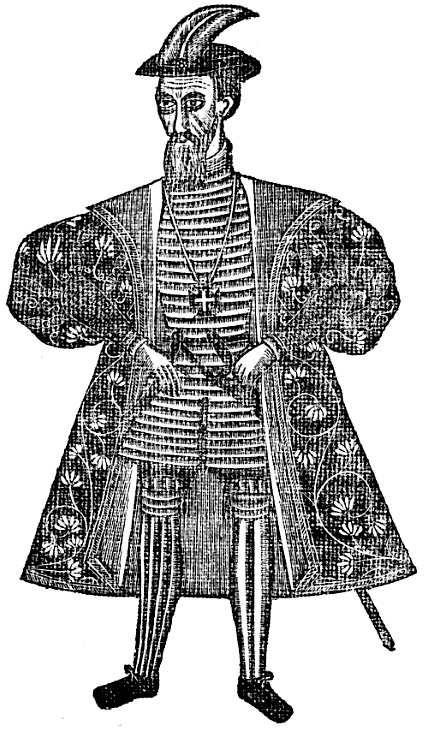
Dom Pedro Mascarenhas.

Sultan Mahmud survived the destruction of Bintan, and escaped to Sumatra, where he later died. The defeat of the former Sultan of Malacca at Bintan impressed many rulers around the strait, who sent embassies seeking treaties with the Portuguese, which afforded Malacca great prosperity for many years thereafter.

== First Luso-Johor War 1533–1536 ==
After the destruction of Bintan and the death of Sultan Mahmud, his son Alauddin Riayat Shah II of Johor founded the sultanate of Johor on the Malay Peninsula, who was hostile towards the Portuguese in Malacca. In 1533 the Sultan of Johor had a Portuguese ambassador publicly tortured to death with boiling water, which amounted to a declaration of war. Transgressions on the lives of ambassadors and messengers were highly contrary to Portuguese (and European) procedure, but common in Asia.

In May 1534, a small Johor fleet of 17 oarships clashed with a Portuguese flotilla near the Muar River and killed Dom Paulo da Gama, son of Vasco da Gama and brother of the captain of Malacca Dom Estevão da Gama.

=== Battle of Ugentana 1535 ===
After the death of his brother Paulo, the captain of Malacca Estevão da Gama attacked Johor on June 1535, with a carrack, a square-rigged caravel and 18 light oarvessels with about 400 Portuguese soldiers plus 400 "combat slaves". The Portuguese sailed up the river which led to Johor and engaged its defenses but the Sultan fled to the jungle under the cover of the night. The Portuguese captured a number of vessels, spoils and artillery in the city, which was then razed.

=== Battle of Ugentana 1536 ===
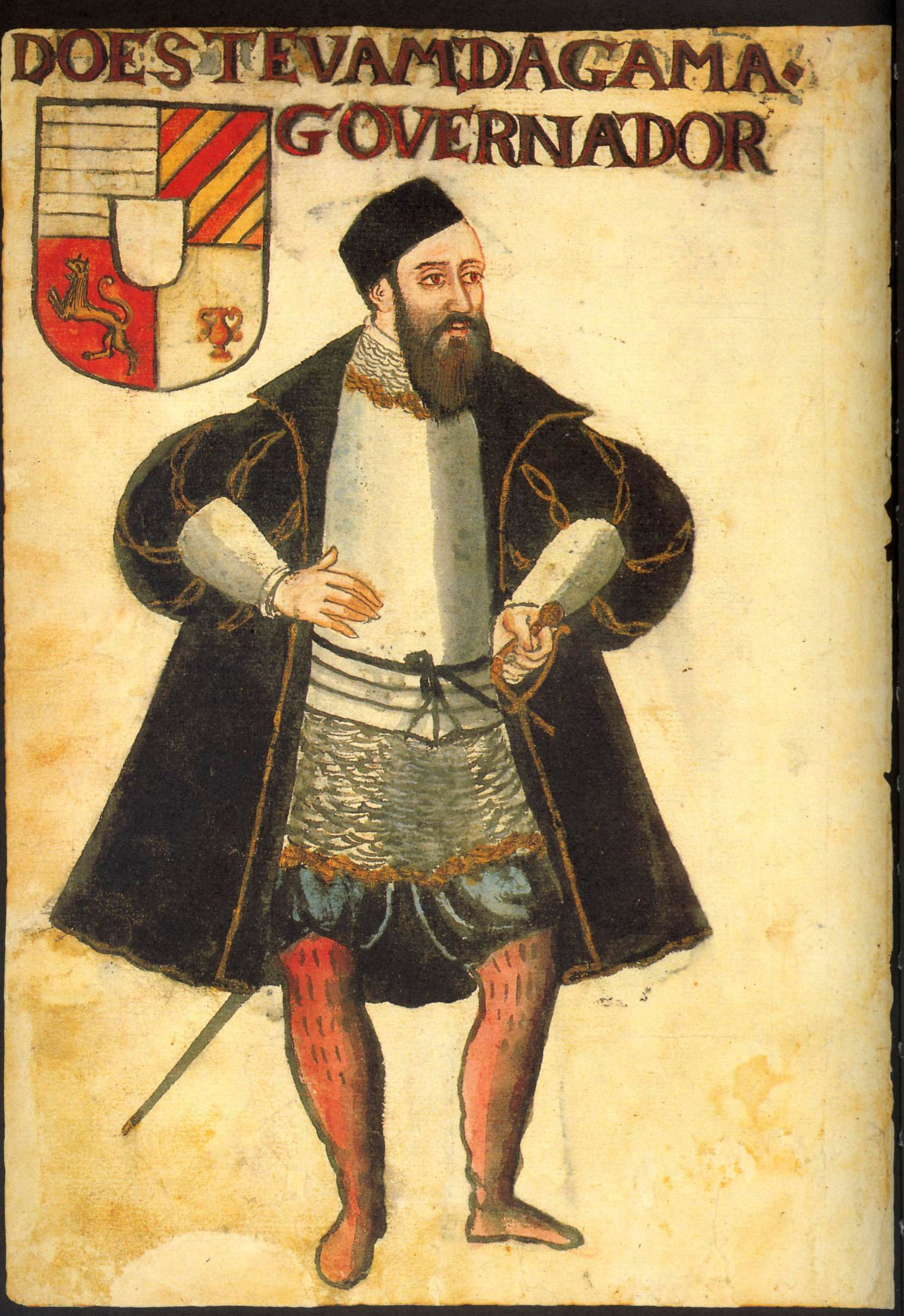
Dom Estevão da Gama, captain of Malacca between 1535 and 1539.

In 1535 the sultan avoided the total destruction of his forces by abandoning the city and retreating into the jungle, while most of his fleet was out at sea the time. Hence, he was able to rebuild his city and continue harassing the navigation of Malacca after the Portuguese had left, though weakened after the Portuguese captured their artillery the previous year. Dom Estevão departed from Malacca with a carrack, a number of light oarships, 400 Portuguese soldiers, 400 auxiliaries and an unrecorded number of combat slaves with arquebuses.

The Portuguese engaged the Sultan's forces close to Johor, and captured the Johor fleet. The Sultan witnessed the battle from atop an elephant, and again attempted to evacuate into the jungle, but he suffered a revolt and his baggage train carrying his treasure was assaulted mid-retreat by his own fleeing forces. Under these conditions, he sought terms with the Portuguese, but Dom Estevão only trusted the Sultan with a treaty after his uncle was given up as a valuable hostage.

With the capture of the Johor fleet, navigation in the strait of Singapore became much safer and trade increased.

== Later conflicts ==
=== Siege of Malacca 1551 ===
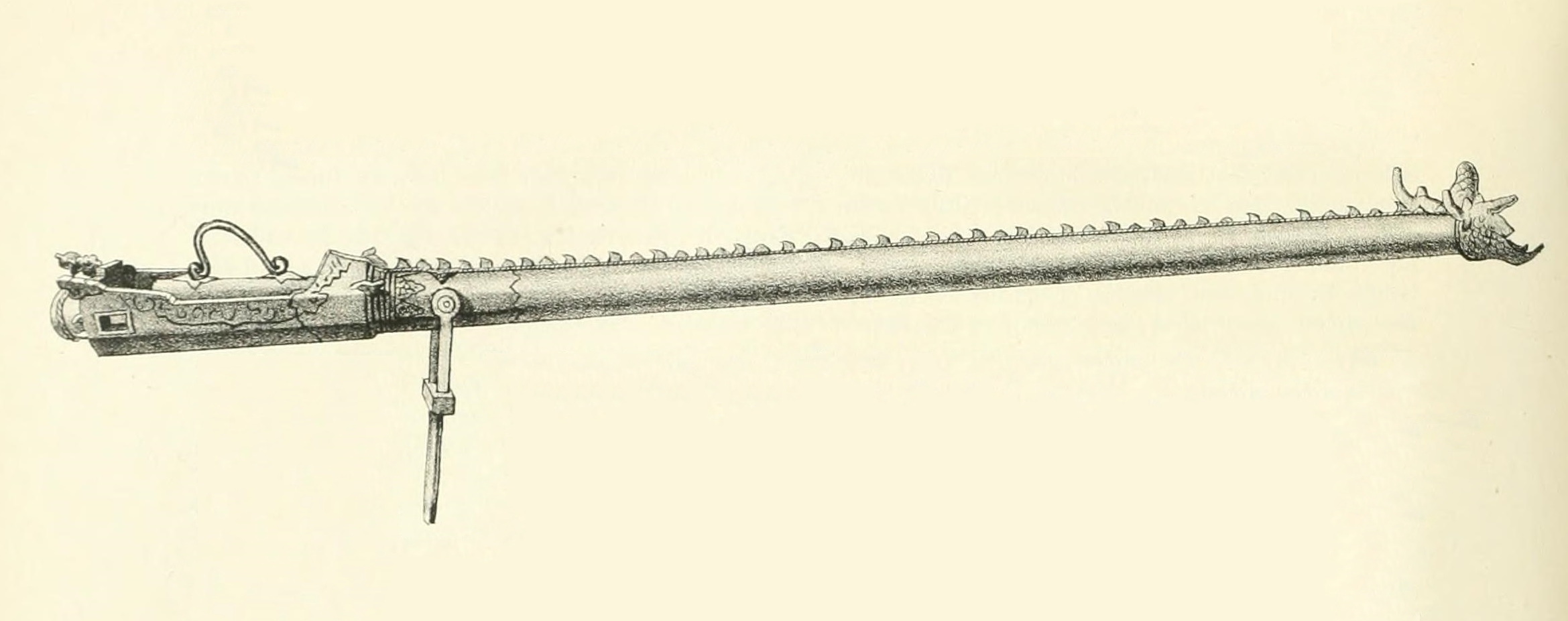
Malay swivel gun.

The Sultan of Johor disregarded the peace treaty signed in 1536 and organized a large fleet that included the allied forces of the Sultanate of Johor, the Sultanate of Perak, the Sultanate of Pahang and the Sultanate of Jepara to attack Portuguese Malacca in 1551. It included 200 ships, of which about 150 were oarships and about 40 were Javanese junks, and 10,000 men, of which 6,000 were Malays and 4,000 Javanese. The garrison of Malacca numbered 400 Portuguese.

An attempt to lure the garrison out failed and Malacca was besieged. Failing to overcome Portuguese defenses or sever the naval supply lines of the city after three months, the Malays withdrew when they heard rumours put into circulation by the captain of Malacca Dom Pedro da Silva that the Portuguese were about to attack their coastal cities. The Javanese were then defeated by the Portuguese in battle and forced to reembark, having suffered heavy losses. Most Portuguese casualties were caused in the aftermath, by poisoned water wells.

=== Siege of Johor 1587 ===
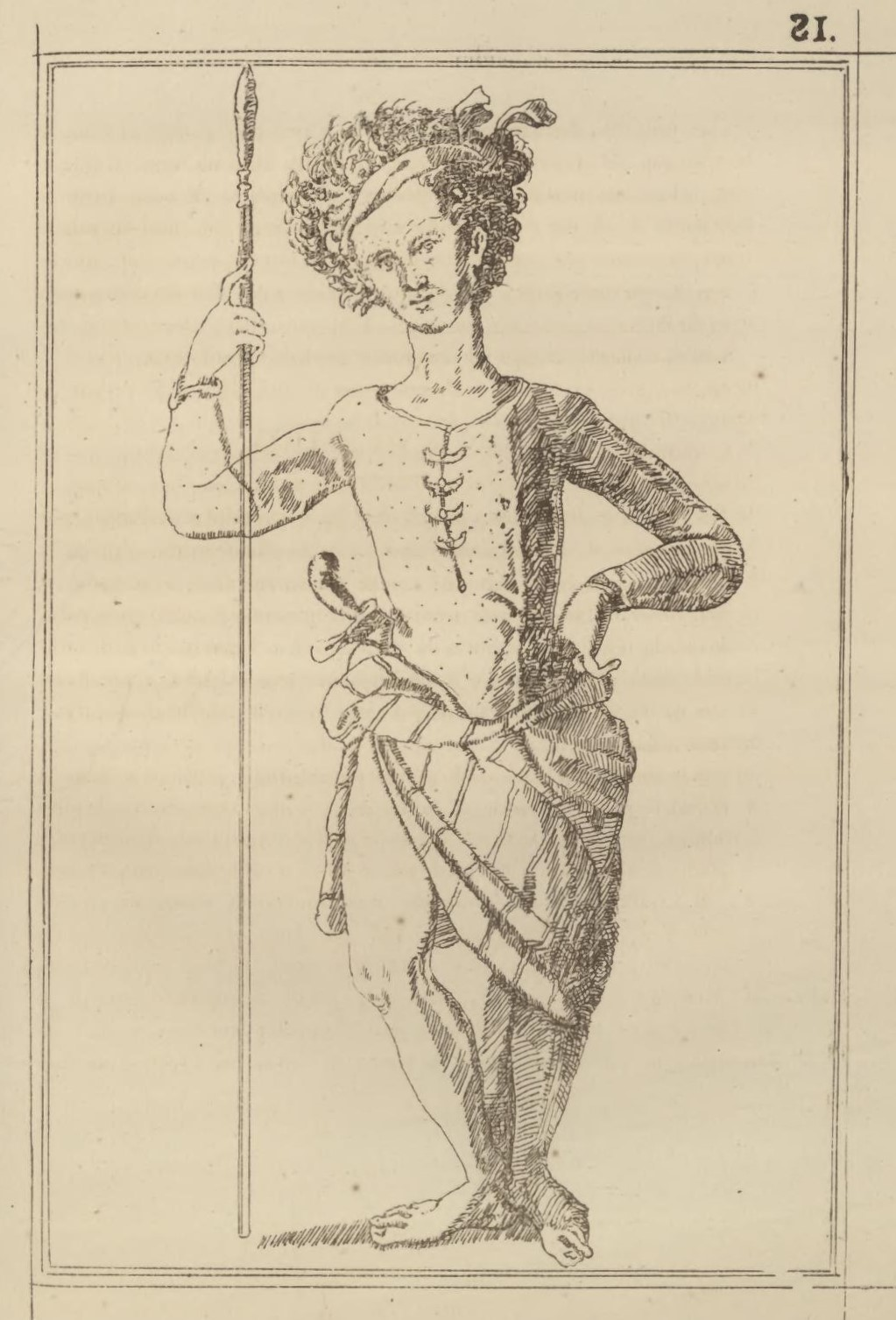
Portuguese sketch of a Malay warrior.

In 1586 naval forces of Johor began diverting shipping to the Singapore Strait. A large Johor fleet attempted to attack Malacca itself, but was driven back by the presence of heavily armed galleons in its harbour. The captain of Malacca João da Silva requested urgent reinforcements from Goa and the viceroy Dom Duarte de Meneses dispatched 500 men and 3 galleons, under the command of Dom Paulo de Lima to deal with the threat.

The forces of Johor were incapable of preventing the heavy Portuguese infantry from landing and storming the city after a naval bombardment, and its sultan was forced to retreat into the jungle in a rout. The Portuguese captured ample spoils, which included over 1,000 cannon, the great majority of them of small caliber, 1,500 firearms, and burned upwards of 2,000 craft of many sizes. Following the attack, Dom Pedro de Lima also sacked Bintan, then a vassal of Johor.

=== Siege of Malacca 1606 ===
In 1606, Dutch East India Company admiral Cornelis Matelief besieged Malacca with the support of the ruler of Johor, Sultan Alauddin Riayat Shah III of Johor who signed an alliance in May. In exchange, the Dutch would keep Malacca for themselves and would be able to conduct trade with Johor.

The small Portuguese garrison, under the command of André Furtado de Mendonça managed to hold out and stop any direct Dutch attacks on the city until additional reinforcements could arrive led by Martim Afonso de Castro, which caused the Dutch to retreat from the siege. After they retreated, the Dutch were again defeated by the Portuguese at the Battle of Cape Rachado.

=== Johor expedition 1607 ===
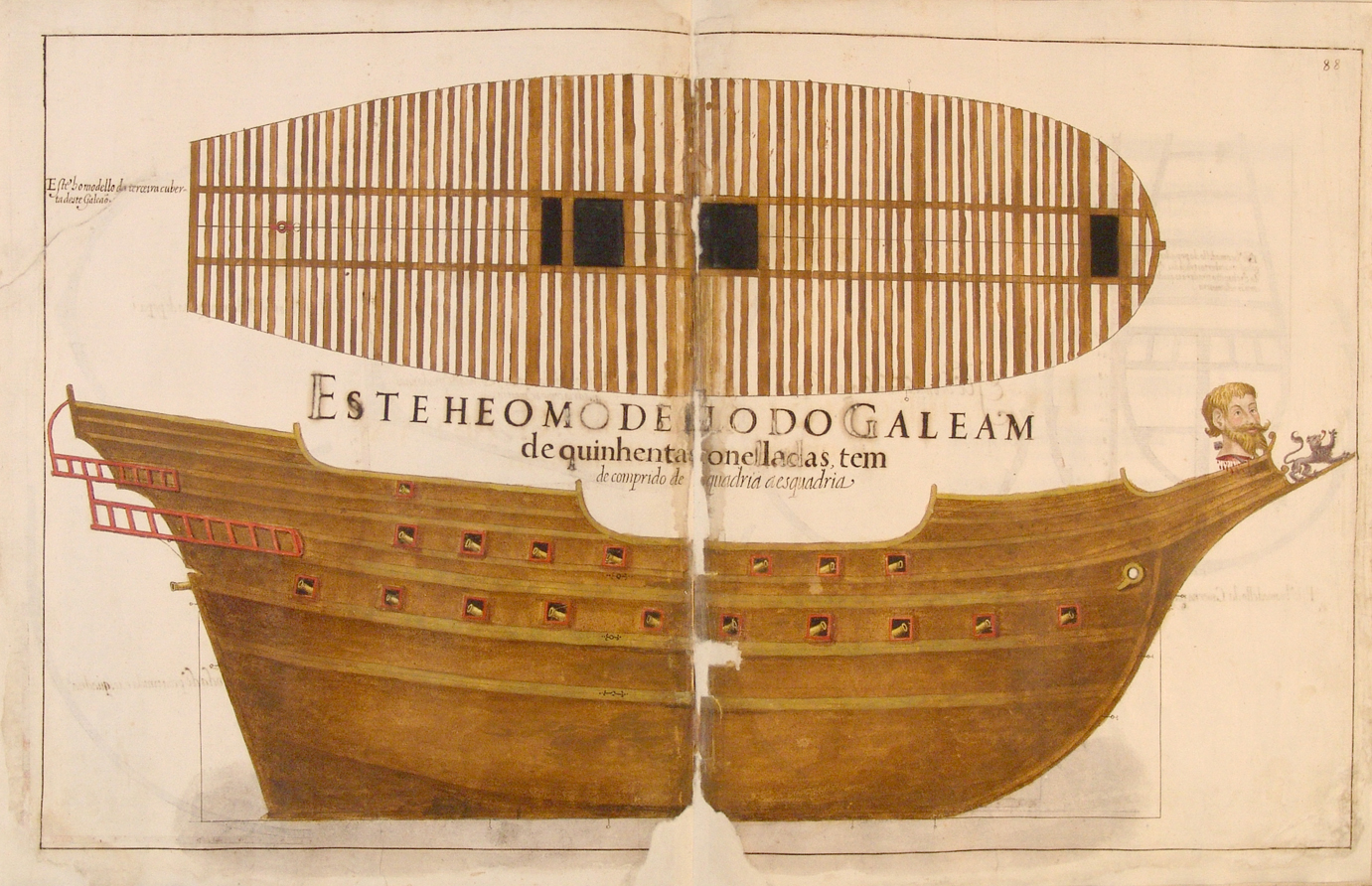
1616 depiction of a Portuguese galleon.

After Johor had signed an alliance with the Dutch East India Company in 1606, Portuguese naval forces had kept the Johor River under blockade, thereby severing the sultanate's trade and communications.

On December 15, 1607, a Portuguese naval force numbering 13 galleons anchored before the city in preparation for an attack. Further military action however, proved unnecessary. Upon spotting the Portuguese, the Sultan of Johor panicked, set his capital on fire and fled into the jungle, along with the resident Dutch merchants. The Portuguese destroyed the Johor fleet and achieved their objectives through a demonstration of sea power.

In 1610, Johor signed a peace agreement with the Portuguese.

=== Siege of Malacca 1641 ===
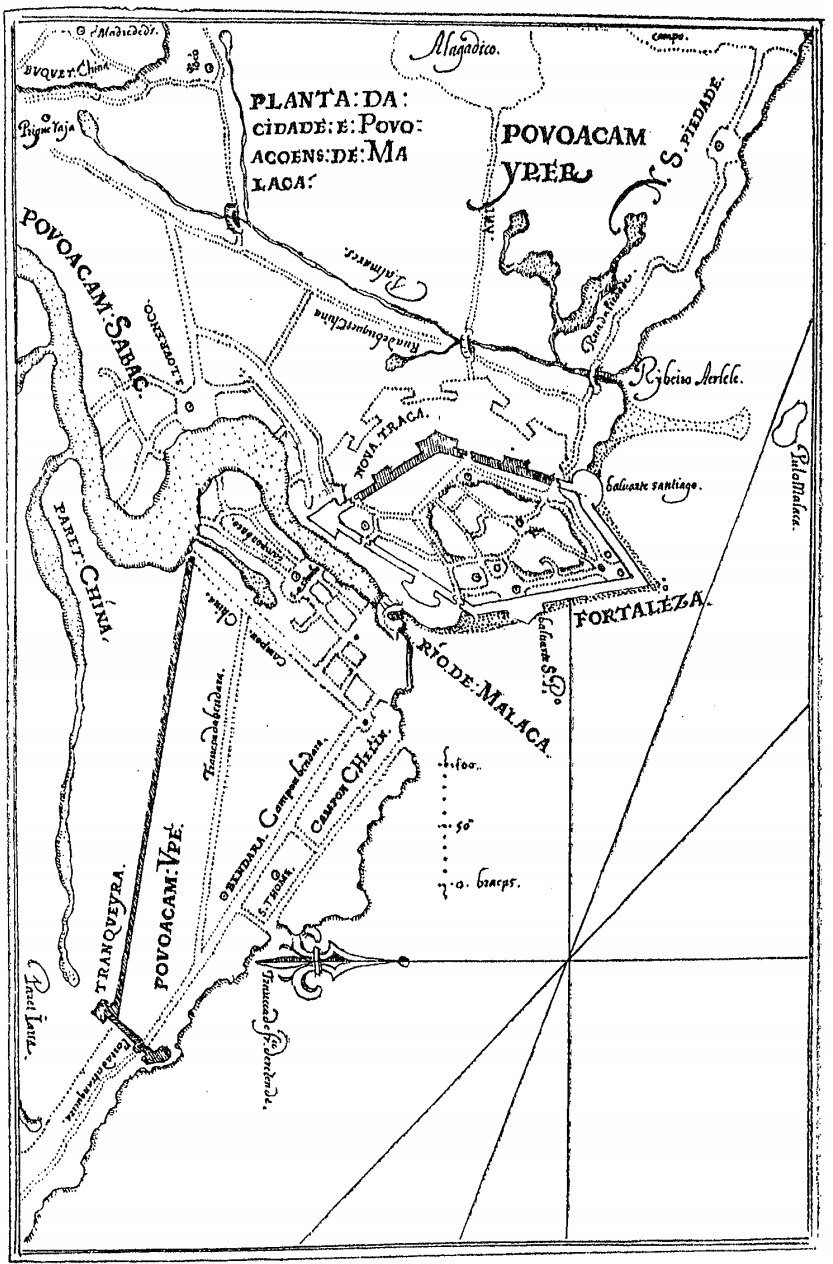
1606 plan of Portuguese Malacca.

After years of intermittent conflict, the Dutch East India Company had amassed a force of 2,000 Europeans at Batavia by August 1639, with the intent of sending the troops to Malacca. In early May 1640, the government of Batavia resolved to capture Malacca, whether by negotiation or violence. The previous commander, Cornelis Symonz van der Veer, had died since then, so Sergeant Major Adriaen Antonisz was sent in his place. The Portuguese were led by Governor Manuel de Sousa Coutinho. Their city was heavily fortified, with 32-foot-high (9.8 m) walls that could stand bombardment from both sides. The citadel possessed 70 heavy guns and between 40 and 50 lighter ones. The Portuguese garrison consisted of 260 men, although the Dutch claimed that the best soldiers in the defence were the native and mixed-racial inhabitants, who numbered about 2,000–3,000 in total. They also claimed that only a powerful European army was capable of bringing it down.

The Dutch had support from their Javanese and Bandanese allies, as well as Mardijkers, who numbered 95 in total. Their Johor allies brought 500–600 men of their own. After an over five-month siege, Malacca was seized by the Dutch East India Company, ending nearly 130 years of official Portuguese presence in the region.

== See also ==
- Military history of Portugal
- History of Malaysia
- Dutch–Portuguese War
- Acehnese-Portuguese conflicts
- Ottoman–Portuguese conflicts (1538–1560)
- Ottoman–Portuguese conflicts (1586–1589)
- Sinhalese-Portuguese conflicts
- Ternatean–Portuguese conflicts
- Luso-Asians
- Kristang people
- A Famosa
