= Siege of Malacca (1640–1641) =

Dutch siege against Portugal in Malaysia

- Part of Dutch–Portuguese War
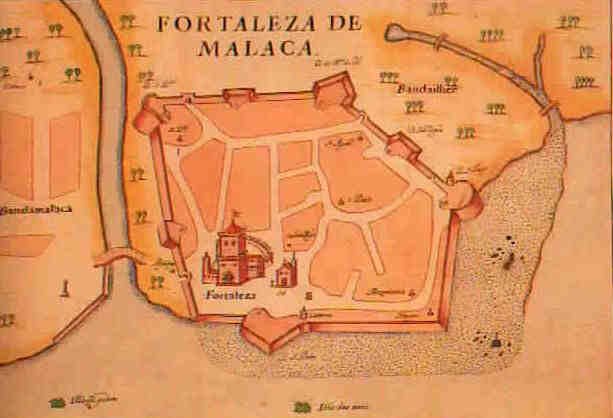
- 1635 map of the Portuguese fort and the city of Malacca.
Date	3 August 1640 – 14 January 1641; 5 months, 1 week, and 4 days
Location	Malacca, Malay Peninsula 2°11′33″N 102°15′0″E
Result	Dutch–Johor victory
Territorial changes	Establishment of Dutch Malacca

Belligerents
Dutch East India Company; Johor Sultanate	Portugal

Commanders and leaders
(Dutch East India Company) Adriaen Antonisz #; (Dutch East India Company) Jakob Cooper #; (Dutch East India Company) Minne Williemsz Caertekoe; (Dutch East India Company) Johannes Lamotius	(Portugal) Manuel de Sousa Coutinho (surrendered)

Casualties and losses
~1,000–1,500	Unknown
- ~7,000–13,000 civilians
- Location within Peninsular Malaysia

The siege of Malacca (3 August 1640 – 14 January 1641) was initiated by the Dutch East India Company and their local ally, Johor, against Portuguese Malacca. It ended with a Portuguese surrender and, according to Portugal, the deaths of thousands of Portuguese individuals. The roots of the conflict began in the late 16th century when the Dutch arrived in the vicinity of Malacca. From there, they launched occasional attacks against the Portuguese colony, including multiple failed sieges. In August 1640, the Dutch commenced their final siege, which took a heavy toll on both sides, with disease and starvation rampant. Finally, after the loss of several major commanders and numerous troops, the Dutch stormed the citadel, completely ending Portugal's control of the city. Ultimately, the new colony was of little importance to the Dutch compared to their previously existing local territory, Batavia.

== Background ==
Malacca, established by the Malays in the 1400s, was a significant hub of trade toward the beginning of the 16th century. It was conquered by the Portuguese Empire in 1511, and was noted for its wealth and prestige by Portuguese officer Duarte Barbosa. Historian ShawnaKim Lowey-Ball has argued that Portugal's exploitation of the division between Hindus and Muslims led to Malacca's economic decline and loss of the status it once held under their rule. Another issue caused by Portugal was the reformed government it introduced, which attempted to impose Catholicism, create a singular currency, and monopolise the spice trade.

The arrival of the Dutch in Aceh in 1598 further disturbed the balance of power in the area. Rumours of what they had done to the inhabitants of Bantam led Portuguese merchants to describe them as pirates. The Dutch were also fiercely protective of the new trading area they had gained.

=== Prior conflicts ===
The Dutch East India Company had been seeking greater dominance of the East Indies for decades before the invasion. Besides the Portuguese, their rivals included the Malays, the Javanese, and the Acehnese. Cornelis Matelief de Jonge began a siege in 1606, but was forced to lift it prematurely. Another siege attempt was launched in 1608 by Pieter Willemsz Verhoeff, but similarly ended in failure. More unsuccessful attempts occurred during 1623–1627. Occasional vessels continued to arrive in the years that followed, seeking to harass the Portuguese forces. Cornelis Symonz van der Veer was a leader of these attacks, attacking vessels and blocking the transport of supplies.

== Preparation ==
After years of intermittent conflict, the Dutch East India Company had amassed a force of 2,000 Europeans at Batavia by August 1639, with the intent of sending the troops to Malacca. They also formed an alliance with the local ruler of Aceh, who readily offered to support their expedition, planned for November or December. The expedition was postponed, however, due to both overseas conflict in Ceylon and friction between the rulers of Aceh and Johor. Despite the aggressive behaviour of Aceh's leader toward Johor's, the latter was willing to forgive, and help take down the Portuguese at Malacca. Despite this, the ruler of Aceh remained unwavering, while Johor prepared its forces, including six shallops. In October, the Dutch conducted a raid and captured several prisoners, including a nobleman named Louis Pacheco, and some livestock, then exchanging seven of the captives for four imprisoned Dutch not long afterwards.

In early May 1640, the government of Batavia resolved to capture Malacca, whether by negotiation or violence. The previous commander, Cornelis Symonz van der Veer, had died since then, so Sergeant Major Adriaen Antonisz was sent in his place. The Portuguese were led by Governor Manuel de Sousa Coutinho. Their city was heavily fortified, with 32-foot-high (9.8 m) walls that could withstand bombardment from both land and sea. The citadel possessed 70 heavy guns and between 40 and 50 lighter ones. The Portuguese garrison consisted of 260 men, although the Dutch claimed that the best soldiers in the defence were the native and mixed-racial inhabitants, who numbered about 2,000–3,000 in total. They also claimed that only a powerful European army was capable of bringing it down.

== Siege ==
On 3 August 1640, the Dutch East India Company landed twelve companies, a total of 600 men, including 130 sailors. They were then organised into three battalions of four companies each. They had support from Javanese and Bandanese allies, as well as Mardijkers, who numbered 95 in all. Their Johor allies brought 500–600 men of their own. These troops moved to the Portuguese citadel to meet another 200 pro-Dutch Europeans, with a similar amount of natives. Despite Portuguese bombardment, they were able to drive the Portuguese forces past two lines of trenches, all the way to the walls of a suburb near the city. There, they captured the Portuguese guns, as well as one mixed-race individual, two European women, and two European children. Portugal began to burn the houses near the city, while the Dutch set up new positions with guns in the suburb. As the siege continued, the Dutch received more troops and supplies from Batavia, including sailors, soldiers, pigs, oranges, sugar, and more. The Dutch maintained the siege despite losses to sickness. Europeans and natives clashed intermittently on both sides through September and October.

According to a letter that reached Batavia in mid-November, famine was beginning to overtake the city, with defectors leaving it daily, while the siege remained strong. The Dutch troops praised their Malay allies for their taking of cattle and fruit from the Portuguese. Both allies struggled to traverse the area, as the swamp environment around the city required wading through waist-deep water, entirely impossible to cross at high tide. At this time, the Dutch claimed to have 2,063 men, 400 of them native. Adriaen Antonisz, their commander, fell sick around this time, and eventually died after eighteen days of illness. He was succeeded by Jacob Cooper. Cooper died of plague on 3 January, about a month after the third commander in line, Pieter van den Broeke, who perished on 3 December. Despite their losses, the Dutch did not lose hope, and on 5 January 1641, Minne Williemsz Caertekoe, their new commander, declared their council had decided that the next Wednesday would be reserved for fasting and prayer, in preparation to storm the citadel.

About 650 Dutch troops successfully seized the citadel on 14 January. Caertekoe was sick at the time, so Sergeant Major Johannes Lamotius led their forces. The Portuguese claimed to have lost 7,000 people, although it was not specified whether this figure referred to combatants, civilians, or both. The Dutch declared a loss of just under one thousand.

== Aftermath ==
The Portuguese prisoners taken by the Dutch East India Company were disappointed by the defeat, as they believed it would severely harm their position in the East Indies. Some of the wealthier Portuguese were allowed to take their riches and slaves and leave for Goa unharmed. Contrary to a story circulated for centuries afterwards, there is no historical evidence that the Portuguese governor was paid by the Dutch to betray his people. According to this story, the Dutch killed him immediately after to avoid having to spend the money, although Dutch reports state he died of illness two days after Malacca's conquest, receiving Catholic rites and proper military honours.

Iskandar Thani, the Sultan of Aceh, who had been furious at the inclusion of Johor in the invasion, died by poisoning that January. He had had numerous enemies, both within and outside of his domain. Johor did not request any part in the city's administration, leaving it entirely to the Dutch, as their main goal had been to drive the Portuguese out. The Dutch continued to focus on their existing colony of Batavia, putting little time or energy into their newly acquired Malacca. In the Anglo-Dutch Treaty of 1824, the Dutch exchanged it with the United Kingdom for British Bencoolen.

== See also ==
- Malay–Portuguese conflicts
