= Battle of Johor (1586) =

1586 battle

Date	1586
Location	Malay Peninsula
Result	Johor victory

Belligerents
Portuguese Empire	Sultanate of Johor

Commanders and leaders
Pedro Vello; Pedro de Cuma Carneyro	Ali Jalla Abdul Jalil Shah II

Strength
8 ships	Unknown

Casualties and losses
4 ships lost	Unknown

The Battle of Johor was a military conflict between the Johorese and Portuguese in 1586. Following a successful Portuguese raid on the Johorese town, the returning fleet was defeated by the Sultan's navy.

== Battle ==
In 1586, the Johorese Sultan, Ali Jalla Abdul Jalil Shah II, also called by the Portuguese "Rajale", was disappointed with the compensation he received from the Portuguese on account of his ship being sunk in Malacca. The Sultan ordered the supplies to the city to be cut off. In retaliation, the Portuguese dispatched Pedro Vello with a fleet of eight ships with a mission to burn a town near Johor. The Portuguese achieved their objective; however, on their way to return, the Portuguese met the Johorese fleet that was awaiting them. A battle ensued between the two in which the Portuguese were badly defeated and in the process lost 4 of their ships. The Portuguese would've probably lost all of their ships, had not the intervention of a Portuguese galleon led by Pedro de Cuma Carneyro which assisted them in the escape of the remaining vessels. The Sultan, happy with his victory, decided to attack Malacca in the same year with 100 ships; however, his attack was repelled.
