= Sultan of Johor =

Sovereign ruler of the state of Johor

- Sultan and Yang-di Pertuan of the State of Johor, The Abode of Dignity and its dependencies Duli Yang Maha Mulia Sultan Yang di-Pertuan bagi Negeri dan Jajahan Takluk Johor Darul Takzim سلطان يڠ دڤرتوان باڬي نڬري دان ججهن تعلوق جوهر دارالتعظيم
- State

Incumbent
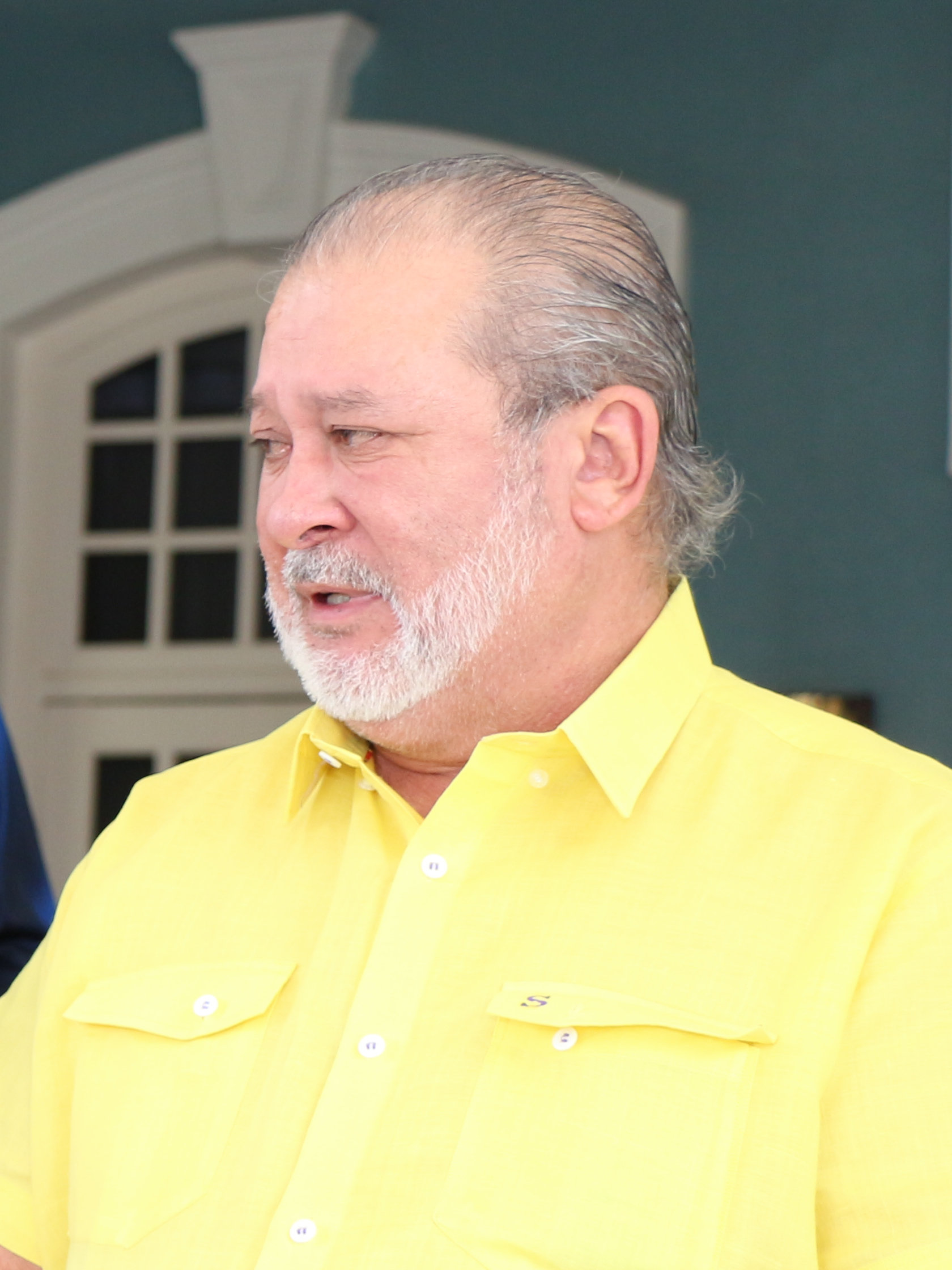
- Sultan Ibrahim since 23 January 2010; 23 March 2015 (Coronation)

Details
- Style: His Majesty
- Heir apparent: Tunku Ismail Ibni Sultan Ibrahim Ismail
- First monarch: Alauddin Riayat Shah II
- Formed: 1528; 498 years ago (original); 1886; 140 years ago (modern)
- Residences: Istana Bukit Serene, Johor Bahru
- Website: royal.johor.my

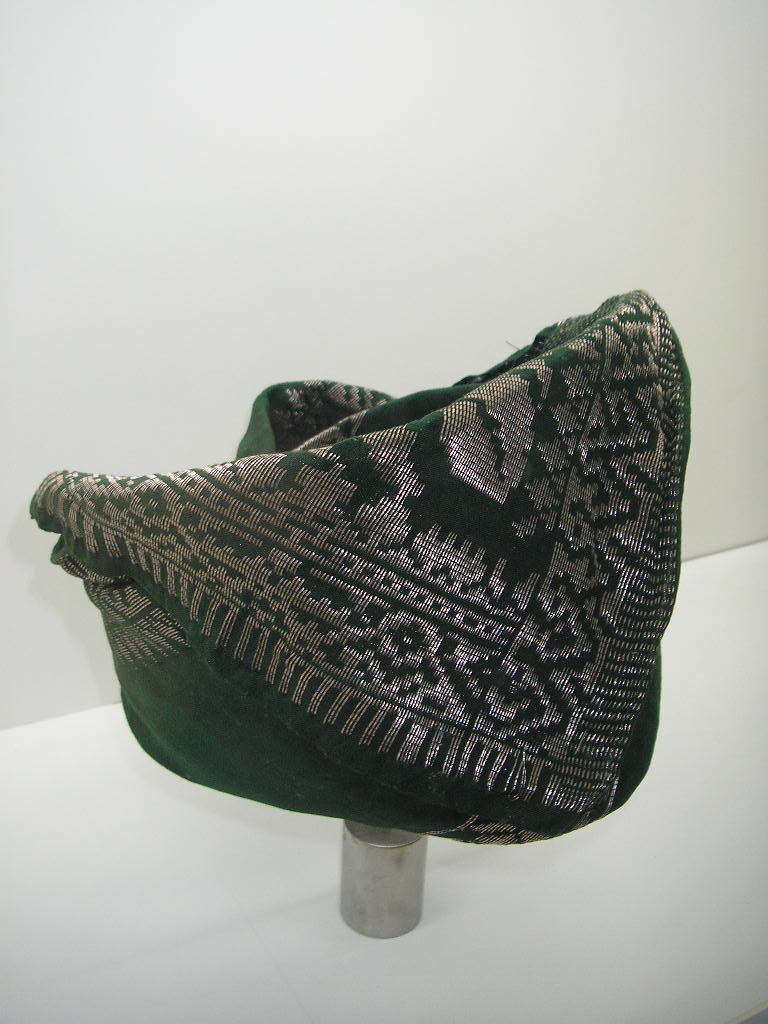
The Johor Sultan's Headgear (Solek Temenggong). This headgear from the State at the End of the Land is one of the costumes of the last Sultan Ismail of Johor. The design of this headgear is based on the style of the Split Coconut headdress.

The Sultan of Johor (Malay: Sultan Johor; Jawi: سلطان جوهر) is a hereditary seat and the sovereign ruler of the Malaysian state of Johor. In the past, the sultan held absolute power over the state and was advised by a bendahara. Currently, the role of bendahara has been taken over by first minister (Malay: Menteri Besar) with the constitutional monarchy system via Johor State Constitution. The sultan is the constitutional head of state of Johor. The sultan has his own independent military force, the Royal Johor Military Force (Malay: Askar Timbalan Setia Negeri Johor). The sultan is also the Head of Islam in Johor.

== History ==
The first sultan of Johor was Alauddin Riayat Shah II, who reigned from 1528 to 1564. He was the son of the last sultan of Malacca, Mahmud Shah. The descendants of the Sultanate of Malacca ruled Johor until the death of Sultan Mahmud II in 1699, when the throne was taken over by Sultan Abdul Jalil Shah IV, marking the start of the House of Bendahara's rule over Johor. Abdul Jalil Shah IV had been a bendahara before the death of Mahmud II.

=== Modern period ===
Sultan Ali ruled Johor from 1835 to 1855, following the death of his father, Sultan Hussein, who had nominally ruled from 1819. Like his father, Sultan Ali held only symbolic authority, with the original royals of Johor gradually sidelined and effectively exiled to Singapore's Istana Kampong Glam. Both were recognised by the British primarily for diplomatic convenience, but they played little role in the actual administration of Johor. Real political and economic control increasingly came under the influence of Temenggong Daeng Ibrahim and the British colonial authorities, who sought to establish indirect rule in the Malay Peninsula as part of their growing presence in British Malaya.

Internally, Johor experienced a significant shift in political power. Daeng Ibrahim strengthened his position through control of trade routes, the development of plantations and cooperation with British officials. His alignment with British interests enabled him to gradually marginalise Sultan Ali. The British, aiming for administrative efficiency and regional stability, supported Daeng Ibrahim's consolidation of power. In 1855, this culminated in an agreement endorsed by the British, under which Sultan Ali ceded political control to Daeng Ibrahim in exchange for a pension, a keep in Kesang and recognition of his ceremonial title.

This marked the rise of the House of Temenggong and the effective end of the old Sultanate's political relevance in Johor after the royal line was usurped. Following Sultan Ali's removal from power in 1855, the position of Sultan of Johor was effectively de-established. However, descendants of this original line still exist today in Singapore as a separate branch distinct from the reigning dynasty. This lineage includes Tengku Alam Shah, the eldest son of Sultan Ali who tried to restore power to his family with the Jementah Civil War of 1879, as well as Tengku Muhammad Shawal bin Tengku Abdul Aziz, a descendant of that same branch and a fourth-great-grandson of Sultan Hussein. Temenggong Daeng Ibrahim ruled Johor as its de facto sovereign without assuming the title of sultan. His authority continued until his death in 1862, after which his son, Abu Bakar, succeeded him. Initially retaining the title of Temenggong of Johor, Abu Bakar ruled Johor until 1868, when he formally adopted the title of "Maharaja" to reflect his enhanced status and administrative reforms.

==== Restoration ====
In 1885, Abu Bakar sought and obtained official recognition from the British to adopt the title of "sultan", thereby restoring the historical Sultanate under the new ruling lineage. This recognition marked the formal re-establishment of the Sultanate of Johor under the House of Temenggong. Abu Bakar subsequently reigned as sultan from 1886 until his death in 1895, becoming the first modern sultan of the current ruling dynasty.

== Current office-holder ==
The current Sultan of Johor is Ibrahim Ismail Ibni Almarhum Sultan Iskandar Al-Haj, who was proclaimed as the 23rd sultan of Johor on 23 January 2010 and crowned on 23 March 2015 at the Istana Besar, Johor Bahru. His father, Sultan Iskandar Al-Haj ibni Almarhum Sultan Ismail Al-Khalidi, a great-grandson of Sultan Abu Bakar died on 22 January 2010; the death was announced that night. Ibrahim Ismail, the Tunku Mahkota of Johor (Crown Prince of Johor), was appointed as the Pemangku Raja (Regent) of Johor on the same day. The funeral was held on 23 January after the proclamation of Sultan Ibrahim Ismail.

== List of office bearers ==
Sultans of Johor	Reign
Malacca-Johor dynasty
Alauddin Riayat Shah II	1528–1564
Muzaffar Shah II	1564–1570
Abdul Jalil I	1570–1571
Ali Jalla Abdul Jalil Shah II	1571–1597
Alauddin Riayat Shah III	1597–1615
Abdullah Ma'ayat Shah	1615–1623
Abdul Jalil Shah III	1623–1677
Ibrahim Shah	1677–1685
Mahmud Shah II	1685–1699
Bendahara dynasty
Abdul Jalil Shah IV (Bendahara Abdul Jalil)	1699–1720
Malacca-Johor dynasty (claim)
Abdul Jalil Rahmat Shah I (Raja Kecil)	1718–1722
Bendahara dynasty
Sulaiman Badrul Alam Shah	1722–1760
Abdul Jalil Muazzam Shah	1760–1761
Ahmad Riayat Shah	1761–1770
Mahmud Shah III	1770–1811
Abdul Rahman Muazzam Shah I	1811–1819
Ahmad Hussein Muazzam Shah	1819–1835
Ali Iskandar Muazzam Shah	1835–1855
Temenggong dynasty (Sultan of Modern Johor)
Abu Bakar al-Khalil	1886–1895
Ibrahim al-Masyhur	1895–1959
Ismail al-Khalidi	1959–1981
Iskandar al-Mutawakkil Alallah	1981–2010
Ibrahim Ismail	2010–present

== Genealogy tree ==
- Dato Temenggong Sri Maharaja Tun Daeng Ibrahim l ibni al-Marhum Dato Temenggong Sri Maharaja Tun ‘Abdu’l Rahman, Maharaja of Johor
  (8 December 1810 – 10 March 1855 – 31 January 1862, ancestor of the sultanal Temenggong dynasty)
  - Sultan Abu Bakar al-Kharllil Ibrahim Shah ibni al-Marhum Dato’ Temenggong Sri Maharaja Tun Ibrahim (3 February 1833 –, r.31 January 1862 – 4 June 1895)
    - Sultan Ibrahim Iskandar al-Mashur ibni al-Marhum Sultan Abu Bakar (17 September 1873 –, r.4 June 1895 – 8 May 1959)
      - Tunku Muhammad Khallid ibni Tunku Mahkota Ibrahim Iskandar (27 ogos 1870 - 6 June 1881)
      - Sultan Ismail al-Kharllil ibni al-Marhum Sultan Ibrahim (28 October 1894 –, r.8 May 1959 – 10 May 1981)
        - Tunku 'Abdu'l Jalil ibni al-Marhum Sultan Ismail (11 May 1924 – 16 May 1925)
        - Tunku 'Abdu'l Rahman ibni al-Marhum Sultan Ismail (29 July – 16 September 1930)
        - Paduka Sri Sultan Mahmud Iskandar Al-Haj ibni al-Marhum Sultan Ismail (8 April 1932 – 10 May 1981 – 22 January 2010)
          Enche’ Besar Hajjah Kalthom binti ‘Abdu’llah (b. in England, 2 December 1935 – 1 June 2018), née Josephine Ruby Trevorrow
          - Sultan Ibrahim Ismail ibni al-Marhum Sultan Mahmud Iskandar al-Haj (Born 22 November 1958 – enthroned 23 January 2010 – )
            Raja Zarith Sofia binti al-Marhum Sultan Idris al-Mutawakil Allah Afifu’llah Shah, princess of Perak (14 August 1959 – )
            - Tunku Ismail Idris ‘Abdu’l Majid Abu Bakar Iskandar ibni Sultan Ibrahim Ismail, Tunku Mahkota (Crown Prince, 30 June 1984 – )
              - Tunku Iskandar Abdul Jalil Abu Bakar Ibrahim ibni Tunku Ismail, Raja Muda (14 October 2017 – )
              - Tunku Abu Bakar Ibrahim ibni Tunku Ismail, (17 July 2019 – )
            - Tunku Aminah Maimunah Iskandariah binti Sultan Ibrahim Ismail (8 April 1986 – )
            - Tunku Idris Iskandar Ismail ‘Abdu’l Rahman ibni Sultan Ibrahim Ismail, Tunku Temenggong (25 December 1987 – )
            - Tunku ‘Abdu’l Jalil Iskandar ibni Sultan Ibrahim Ismail, Tunku Laksamana (5 July 1990 – 5 December 2015)
            - Tunku ‘Abdu’l Rahman Hassanal Jeffri ibni Sultan Ibrahim Ismail, Tunku Panglima (5 February 1993 – )
            - Tunku ‘Abu Bakar ibni Sultan Ibrahim Ismail, Tunku Putera (30 May 2001 – )

== See also ==
- Johor Sultanate
- Monarchies of Malaysia
- Family tree of Johorean monarchs
- Family tree of Malaysian monarchs
- List of crimes committed by members of the Johor royal family

== Notes ==
- Nesalamar Nadarajah, Johore and the Origins of British Control, 1895–1914, Arenabuku, 2000, ISBN 967-970-318-5
- T. Wignesan, "A Peranakan's View of the fin de siècle monde malais – Na Tian Piet's Endearing syair of Epic Proportions" [partial tranls. with introduction and notes to Na Tian Piet's "Sha'er of the late Sultan Abu Bakar (of Johor)"]in The Gombak Review, Vol. 4, N° 2 (International Islamic University Malaysia), Kuala Lumpur, 1999, pp. 101–121.
- T. Wignesan. Sporadic Striving amid Echoed Voices, Mirrored Images and Stereotypic Posturing in Malaysian-Singaporean Literatures. Allahabad: Cyberwit.net, 2008, pp. 196–218. ISBN 978-81-8253-120-8
