= Kota Johor Lama Museum =

Museum in Kota Tinggi, Johor, Malaysia

- Muzium Kota Johor Lama
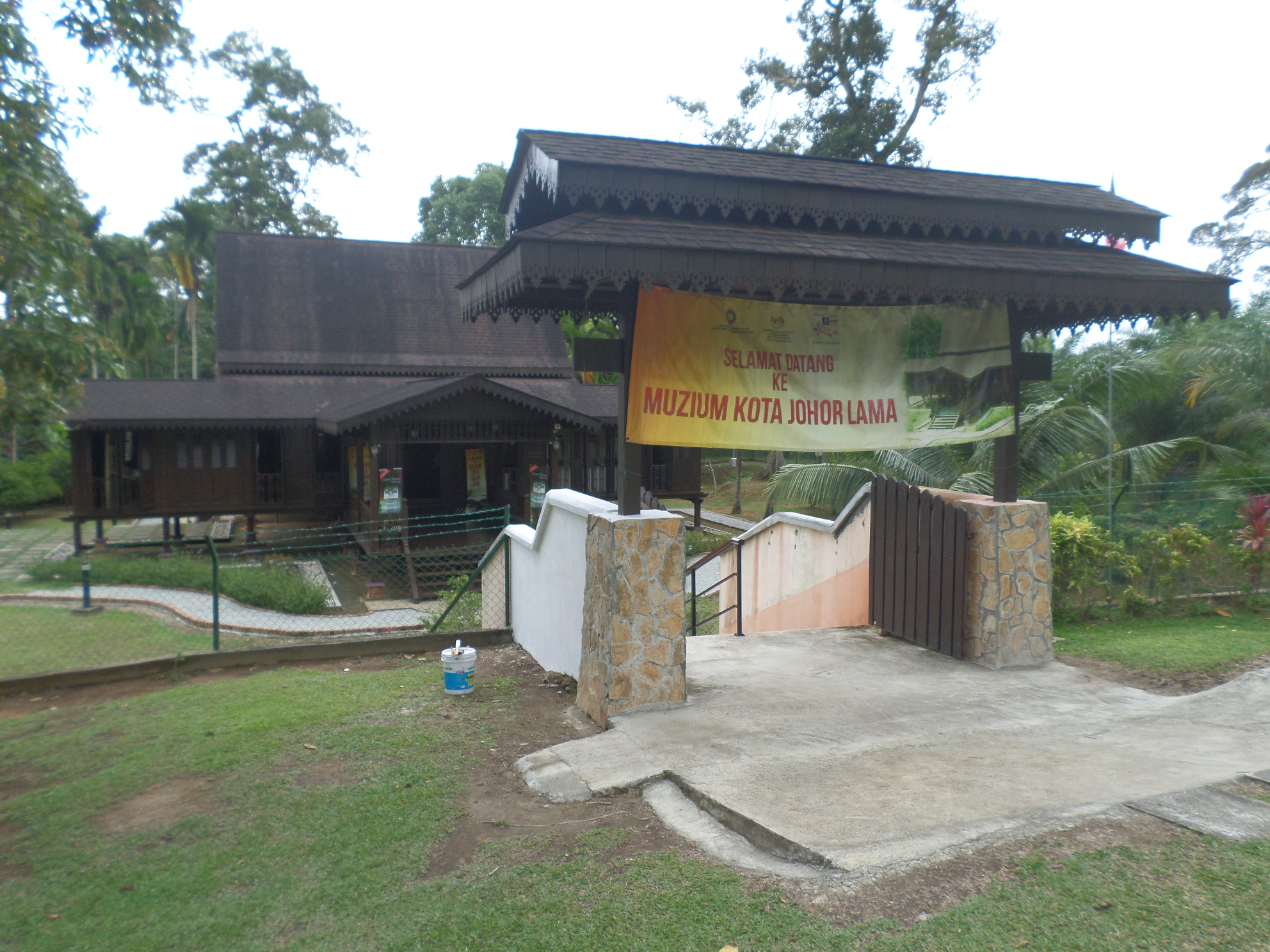
- Established: October 2007
- Location: Kota Tinggi, Johor, Malaysia
- Coordinates: 1°34′47.8″N 104°1′7.1″E
- Type: museum

The Kota Johor Lama Museum (Malay: Muzium Kota Johor Lama) is a museum in Johor Lama, Kota Tinggi District, Johor, Malaysia. The museum is about the history of Johor Lama.

== History ==
The site where the museum stands today was first excavated in 1960 by the British. The second excavation, which occurred in 2004, coincided with the start of the museum construction. The museum was completed in February 2007. It was opened to the public in October 2007.

== Architecture ==
The museum resembles a traditional house. It consists of five sections, such as the introduction of Kota Johor Lama, the rulers of kingdoms, trades and wars, fortresses along the Johor River and various tombs from archaeological excavation done in Kota Tinggi District.

== Exhibitions ==
The museum exhibits information about the history of Kota Johor Lama, which was the center of administration after the fall of Malacca Sultanate in 1511. Since the museum is built within the fortified area of Kota Johor Lama, it sits among many fortified mounds.

== See also ==
- List of museums in Malaysia
