= Johor Sultanate =

Sultanate of Johor

Coordinates: 1°28′46″N 103°43′35″E

Johor Sultanate کسلطانن جوهر Kesultanan Johor
- 1528–1824
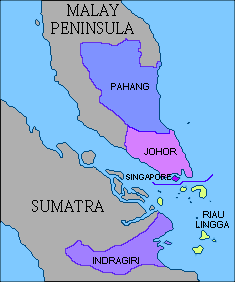
- Map showing the partition of the Johor Empire before and after the Anglo-Dutch Treaty of 1824, with the post-partition Johor Sultanate being highlighted in magenta, at the tip of the Malay Peninsula
- Status: Rump state of the Malaccan Sultanate
- Capital: Sayong Pinang (1530s–1536); Johor Lama (1536–1564); Bukit Seluyut (1564–1570); Johor Lama (1570–1587); Batu Sawar (1587–1618); Lingga (1618–1625); No fixed place (1625–1640); Batu Sawar (1640–1675); No fixed place, Sultan based in Pahang then Riau (1675–1688); Kota Tinggi (1688–1700); Pancur (1700–1708); Riau (1708–1715); Pancur (1715–1720); Riau (1720–?); Source:
- Common languages: Malay (Classical Malay)
- Religion: Sunni Islam
- Government: Absolute Monarchy
- Sultan
  - 1528–1564: Alauddin Riayat Shah II (first)
  - 1811–1819: Abdul Rahman Muazzam Shah (last official sultan)
- Bendahara
  - 1513–1520: Tun Khoja Ahmad (first)
  - 1806–1857: Tun Ali (last)
- Historical era: Early modern period
  - Foundation of the Sultanate: 1528
  - Conflicts with Portugal: 1528-1641
  - Conflicts with Aceh: 1528–1629
  - Dutch Conquest of Malacca: 1641
  - Johor–Jambi wars: 1666–1679
  - Assassination of Mahmud Shah II: 1699
  - Raja Kecil's rebellion: 1718
  - Anglo-Dutch Treaty of 1824: 1824
- Currency: Tin ingot, native gold and silver coins
Preceded by
Malacca Sultanate
Pahang Sultanate
Succeeded by
Siak Sultanate
Selangor Sultanate
Pahang Kingdom
Negeri Sembilan (first confederation)
Riau-Lingga Sultanate
Straits Settlements
Johor Sultanate (modern)
- Today part of: Malaysia; Singapore; Indonesia

The Johor Sultanate (Malay: Kesultanan Johor, Jawi: کسلطانن جوهر; also called the Johor Empire or Johor-Pahang-Riau-Lingga) was founded by Sultan of Malacca Mahmud Shah's son, Alauddin Riayat Shah II in 1528.

Prior to being a sultanate of its own right, Johor had been part of the Malaccan Sultanate before the Portuguese captured its capital in 1511. At its height, the sultanate controlled territory in what is now modern-day Johor, Pahang, Terengganu, territories stretching from the rivers of Klang to the Linggi and Tanjung Tuan, situated respectively in Selangor, Negeri Sembilan and Malacca (as an exclave), Singapore, Pulau Tinggi and other islands off the east coast of the Malay Peninsula, the Karimun Islands, the islands of Bintan, Bulang, Lingga and Bunguran, and Bengkalis, Kampar and Siak in Sumatra.

During the colonial era, the mainland part was administered by the British, and the insular part by the Dutch, thus breaking up the sultanate into Johor and Riau.

== History ==
=== Fall of Malacca and the rise of Johor ===
In 1511, Malacca fell to the Portuguese and Sultan Mahmud Shah was forced to flee Malacca. The sultan made several attempts to retake the capital but his efforts were fruitless. The Portuguese retaliated and forced the sultan to flee to Pahang. Later, the sultan sailed to Bintan and established a new capital there. With a base established, the sultan rallied the disarrayed Malay forces and organised several attacks and blockades against the Portuguese position.

Frequent raids on Malacca caused the Portuguese severe hardship which helped to convince the Portuguese to destroy the exiled sultan's forces. A number of attempts were made to suppress the Malay but it was not until 1526 that the Portuguese razed Bintan to the ground. The sultan then retreated to Kampar in Sumatra and died two years later. He left behind two sons, Muzaffar Shah and Alauddin Riayat Shah II.

The Johor Sultanate was founded in 1528 by Sultan Alauddin Riayat Shah II (1528–1564) and was based at Pekan Tua. Muzaffar Shah went on to establish Perak. Although Alauddin Riayat Shah II and his successor had to contend with attacks by the Portuguese in Malacca and by the Acehnese in Sumatra, they managed to maintain their hold on the Johor Sultanate.

=== Triangular war ===
Aceh attacks on Malacca, Johor and other Malay states

Alauddin Riayat Shah II established a new capital by the Johor River and from there continued to harass the Portuguese. He consistently worked together with his brother in Perak and the Sultan of Pahang to retake Malacca, which by this time was protected by the fort A Famosa.

Around the same time, the Aceh Sultanate in northern Sumatra was beginning to gain substantial influence over the Strait of Malacca. With the fall of Malacca to Christian forces, Muslim traders often skipped Malacca in favour of Aceh or to Johor's capital Johor Lama (Kota Batu). Therefore, Malacca and Aceh became direct competitors.

With the Portuguese and Johor frequently in conflict, Aceh launched multiple raids against both sides to tighten its grip over the strait. The rise and expansion of Aceh encouraged the Portuguese and Johor to sign a truce and divert their attention to Aceh. The truce, however, was short-lived and with Aceh severely weakened, Johor and the Portuguese had each other in their sights again. During the reign of Sultan Iskandar Muda, Aceh attacked Johor in 1613 and again in 1615.

The strength of Aceh was brought to an end with a disastrous campaign against Malacca in 1629, when the combined Portuguese and Johor forces managed to destroy the fleet and 19,000 Acehnese troops according to the Portuguese account. Johor later grew stronger and formed an alliance with the Dutch to attack Portuguese Malacca and conquered it on January 14, 1641, ending the triangular war. In the following month, Iskandar Thani of Aceh died and was succeeded by Queen Taj ul-Alam. Her reign marks the beginning of the decline of Aceh's position as a regional power.

=== Dutch Malacca ===
In the early 17th century, the Dutch reached Southeast Asia. At that time the Dutch were at war with the Portuguese and allied themselves to Johor. Two treaties were signed by Admiral Cornelis Matelief de Jonge on behalf of the Dutch Estates General and Raja Bongsu (later to be Sultan Abdullah Ma'ayat Shah) of Johor in May and September 1606. In January 1641, the Dutch and Johor forces headed by Bendahara Skudai, captured Malacca from the Portuguese. By the time the fortress at Malacca surrendered, the town's population had already been greatly decimated by famine and disease (the plague). As per the agreement of May 1606, the Dutch took control of Malacca and agreed not to seek territories or wage war against Johor. Malacca then became a territory under the control of the Dutch East India Company (VOC) and formally remained a Dutch possession until the Anglo-Dutch Treaty of 1824 was signed.

=== Johor–Jambi wars ===
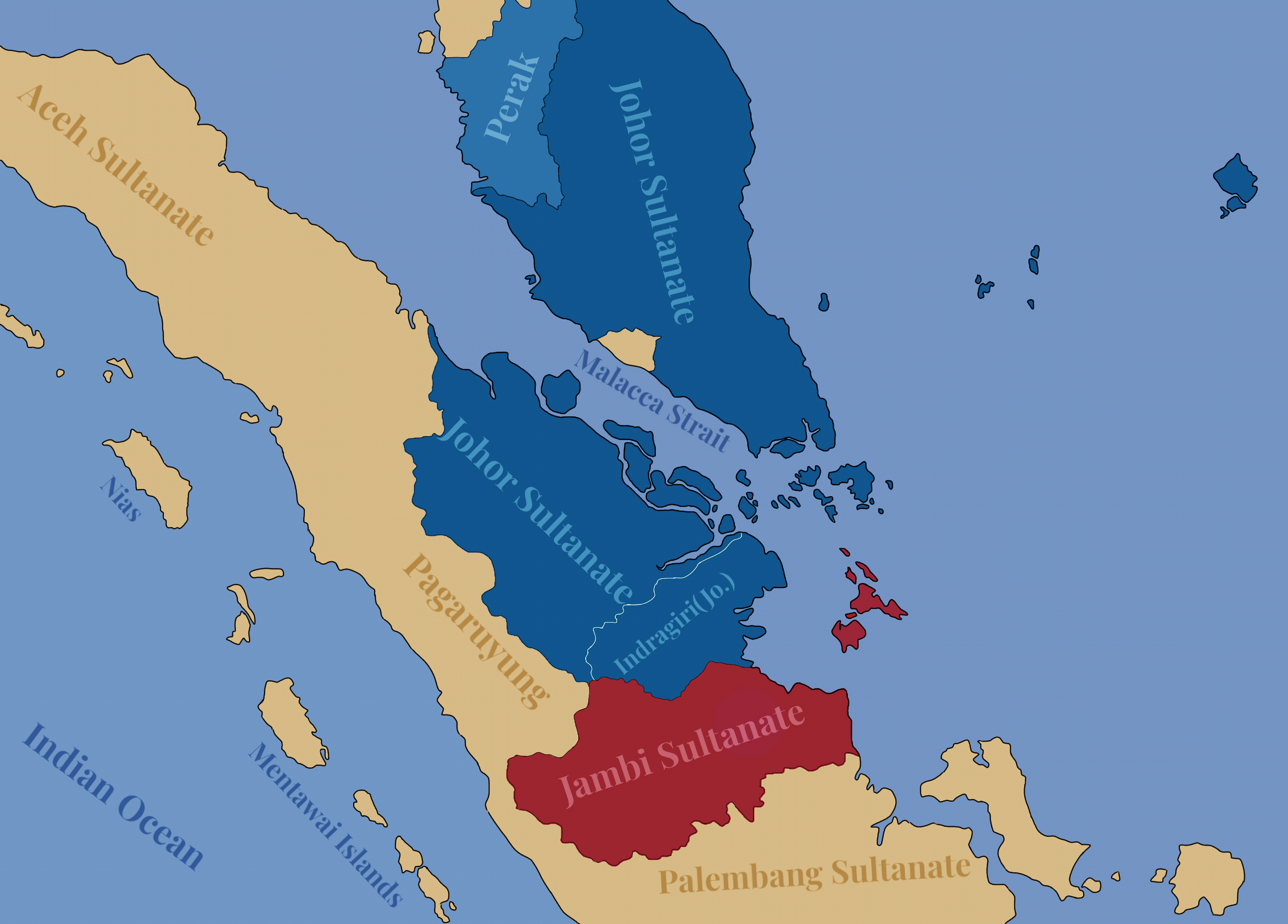
The extent of Johor and Jambi influence throughout the wars

With the fall of Portuguese Malacca in 1641 and the decline of Aceh due to the growing power of the Dutch, Johor started to re-establish itself as a power along the Strait of Malacca during the reign of Sultan Abdul Jalil Shah III (1623–1677). Its influence extended to Pahang, Sungei Ujong, Malacca, Klang and the Riau Archipelago. During the triangular war, the Jambi Sultanate emerged as a regional economic and political power in Sumatra. Initially there was an attempt of an alliance between Johor and Jambi with a promised marriage between the heir Raja Muda and daughter of the Pengeran of Jambi. However, the Raja Muda instead married the daughter of the Laksamana Abdul Jamil who, concerned about the dilution of power from such an alliance, offered his own daughter for marriage instead. The alliance therefore broke down, and a 13-year war then ensued between Johor and the Jambi beginning in 1666. The war was disastrous for Johor as its capital, Batu Sawar, was sacked by Jambi in 1673. Abdul Jalil Shah III escaped to Pahang and died four years later. His successor, Sultan Ibrahim Shah (1677–1685), then engaged the help of the Bugis in the war with Jambi. Johor won the war in 1679, but in a weakened position as the Bugis refused to go home, and the Minangkabaus of Sumatra had started to assert their influence.

After the sacking of Batu Sawar in 1673, the capital of Johor was frequently moved to avoid the threat of attack from Jambi. All through its history, the rulers of Johor had constantly shifted their centre of power many times in their efforts to keep the sultanate together. Johor Lama (Kota Batu) was initially founded by Alauddin Riayat Shah II but was sacked by the Acehnese in 1564. It was then moved to Seluyut, later back to Johor Lama during the reign of Ali Jalla (1571–1597) which was sacked by the Portuguese in 1587, then to Batu Sawar, and Lingga (again sacked by the Portuguese). This is followed by a period with no fixed capital (places included Tanah Puteh and Makam Tauhid) during the reign of Sultan Abdul Jalil Shah III before he moved it to Batu Sawar in 1640. After Batu Sawar was sacked by Jambi, later capitals included Kota Tinggi, Riau, and Pancur.

=== Golden Age ===
In the 17th century Malacca was declining as an important port, allowing Johor to become the dominant regional power. The policy of the Dutch in Malacca drove traders to Riau, a port controlled by Johor. The trade there far surpassed that of Malacca. The VOC was unhappy with that but continued to maintain the alliance because the stability of Johor was important to trade in the region.

The sultan provided all the facility required by the traders. Under the patronage of the Johor elites, traders were protected and prospered. With a wide range of goods available and favourable prices, Riau boomed. Ships from various places such as Cambodia, Siam, Vietnam and all over the Malay Archipelago came to trade. Bugis ships made Riau the centre for spices. Items found in China such as cloth and opium were traded with locally sourced ocean and forest products, tin, pepper and locally grown gambier. Duties were low, and cargo could be discharged or stored easily. Traders found they did not need to extend credit, as the business was good.

Like Malacca before it, Riau was also a centre of Islamic studies and teaching. Many orthodox scholars from the Indian Subcontinent and Arabia were housed in special religious hostels, while devotees of Sufism could seek initiation into one of the many Tariqah (Sufi Brotherhood) which flourished in Riau.

=== Bugis and Minangkabau influence ===
Sultan Mahmud II, was a person of unstable disposition. When Tun Habib was the Bendahara, he effectively shielded the people from Mahmud II's eccentricities. After Tun Habib's death he was replaced by Abdul Jalil. As the Bendahara was only a cousin, he could not rein in Mahmud II's eccentric behaviour.

Sultan Mahmud II ordered the pregnant wife of a noble, Orang Kaya Megat Sri Rama killed, as she had taken a slice of the royal jackfruit. Subsequently, the sultan was assassinated in 1699 by Megat Sri Rama in revenge, leaving no heirs. The Orang Kayas, who were normally tasked with advising the sultan, went to Muar to meet Sa Akar DiRaja, Raja Temenggong of Muar, Mahmud II's uncle and asked for his counsel. He told them that Bendahara Abdul Jalil should inherit the throne which he did as Sultan Abdul Jalil IV. Many, particularly the Orang Laut, felt that the declaration was improper.

The Bugis, who played an important role in defeating Jambi two decades earlier, had huge influence in Johor. Another influential faction in Johor at that time were the Minangkabau. Both the Bugis and the Minangkabau realised that the death of Sultan Mahmud II had provided them with the chance to exert power in Johor. The Minangkabau introduced a Minangkabau prince, Raja Kecil from Siak who claimed he was the posthumous son of Sultan Mahmud II. The prince met with the Bugis and promised the Bugis wealth and political power if they helped the prince to win the throne. However, Raja Kecil broke his promise and installed himself as the new Sultan of Johor (Sultan Abdul Jalil Rahmat Shah) without the knowledge of the Bugis. Sultan Abdul Jalil IV fled to Pahang where he was later killed by an assassin hired by Raja Kecil.

Dissatisfied with Raja Kecil's accession, the son of Sultan Abdul Jalil IV, Raja Sulaiman, asked Daeng Parani of the Bugis to aid him reclaiming the throne. In 1722, Raja Kecil was dethroned by Raja Sulaiman's supporters with the assistance of the Bugis. Raja Sulaiman became the new Sultan of Johor but he was a weak ruler and became a puppet of the Bugis. Daeng Parani's brother, Daeng Merewah, who was made Yam Tuan Muda (crown prince) was the actual controller of Johor.

Throughout the latter reign of Sultan Sulaiman Badrul Alam Shah in the mid-18th century, real power was held by the Bugis. By 1760, several Bugis lineages had intermarried into the royal Johor family and gained great power. These Bugis lineages held the office of Yam Tuan Muda, passing the office back and forth between themselves. The death of Sultan Sulaiman triggered a succession dispute, which was lost by the combined Bendahara-Temenggong court elite to the Bugis faction. From 1760 to 1784, the latter group completely dominated the sultanate. The Johor economy was reanimated under Bugis rule, along with the introduction of Chinese traders. However, by the late 18th century, Engku Muda of the Temenggong faction under Sultan Mahmud Shah III gained power at the expense of the Bugis. Engku Muda's son, Temenggong Abdul Rahman and his descendants would soon be responsible for the growth in prospects for the sultanate.

=== British arrival ===
==== Singapore and the British ====
In 1818, Sir Stamford Raffles was appointed as governor of Bencoolen in western Sumatra. He was convinced that the British needed to establish a new base in Southeast Asia to compete with the Dutch. Though many in the British East India Company (EIC) opposed such an idea, Raffles convinced Lord Hastings of the EIC and governor-general of British India, to side with him. With the governor-general's consent, he and his expedition set out to search for a new base.

When Raffles' expedition arrived in Singapore on 29 January 1819 he discovered a small Malay settlement at the mouth of the Singapore River headed by Temenggong Abdul Rahman, son of Daeng Kechil. Though the island was nominally ruled by Johor, the political situation there was extremely murky. The reigning sultan, Abdul Rahman Muazzam Shah, was under the influence of the Dutch and the Bugis. Hence, he would not agree to a British base in Singapore.

However, Abdul Rahman was ruler only because his older brother, Tengku Hussein or Tengku Long, had been away in Pahang getting married when their father died in 1812. He was appointed by the Yam Tuan Muda of Riau, Raja Jaafar because according to him, in a Malay tradition, a person has to be by the dying sultan's side to be considered as the new ruler. However the matter has to be decided by the Bendehara as the "keeper of adat (tradition)". The older brother was not happy with the development.

Raja Jaafar's sister, the queen of the late Sultan, protested her brother's actions with stating, "... Which adat of succession is being followed? Unfair deeds like this will cause the Johor Sultanate be destroyed!". And she held on the royal regalia refusing to surrender it.

Bendehara Ali was made aware of the affairs of the succession and decided to act. He prepared his fleet to go to Riau to "restore the adat". The British upon learning this despatched a fleet and set up a blockade to stop the forces of Bendehara Ali from advancing.

With Temenggong Abdul Rahman's help, Raffles managed to smuggle Hussein, then living in exile on one of the Riau Islands, back into Singapore. According to a correspondence between Tengku Hussain and his brother, he left for Singapore out of his concern of his son's safety. There he was captured by Raffles and forced to make a deal. Their agreement stated that the British would acknowledge Tengku Hussein as the "legitimate ruler" of "Johor", and thus Tengku Hussein and the Temenggong would receive a yearly stipend from the British. In return, Tengku Hussein would allow Raffles to establish a trading post in Singapore. This treaty was ratified on 6 February 1819.

The British asked Bendehara Ali to recognise Tengku Hussein as a ruler. However, Bendehara Ali claimed that he had no connection to the events in Singapore, as it is the Temenggong's fief and stated that his loyalty lies only with the Sultan of Johor in Lingga.

==== Anglo-Dutch Treaty ====
The Dutch were extremely displeased with Raffles' action. Tensions between the Dutch and British over Singapore persisted until 1824, when they signed the Anglo-Dutch Treaty. Under the terms of that treaty, the Dutch officially withdrew their opposition to the British presence in Singapore. Many historians contend that the treaty divided the spheres of influence between the Dutch and the English and split the Sultanate of Johor into modern Johor and the Riau-Lingga Sultanate. The treaty was signed secretly without the knowledge of the local nobility including the sultan and thus its legitimacy was called into question.

Nevertheless, the British successfully sidelined Dutch political influence by proclaiming Hussein as the Sultan of Johor and Singapore to acquire legal recognition in their sphere of influence in Singapore and Peninsular Malaysia. The legitimacy of Sultan Hussein's proclamation as the sultan of Johor and Singapore was controversial to some of the other Malay rulers. As he was placed on the throne by the British and was seen as a puppet ruler. Temenggong Abdul Rahman's position, on the other hand, was strengthened as it was with his co-operation that the British successfully took de facto control of Johor and Singapore; with the backing of the British he gained influence as Raja Ja'afar. Meanwhile, Sultan Abdul Rahman was installed as the Sultan of Lingga in November 1822, complete with the royal regalia. Sultan Abdul Rahman, who had devoted himself to religion, became contented with his political sphere of influence in Lingga, where his family continued to maintain his household under the administrative direction of Raja Ja'afar who ruled under the auspices of the Dutch.

=== Repairing the damage ===
Sultan Abdul Rahman died in 1832 and was succeeded by his son, Sultan Muhammad Shah (r. 1832–1835). When Raja Jaffar, Yam Tuan Muda of Riau, died and Muhammad Shah was in no hurry to appoint a successor. The sultan saw the damage that was done to the palace during his father's reign and decided to reemphasis and restore adat as a rule governing personal behaviour and politics. He summoned Bendahara Ali (Raja Bendahara Pahang) to Lingga. At Lingga, an adat-steeped function was held. The Bendahara conducted ceremonies (as per adat) aimed at re-educating the nobility and the sultan about their respective duties and responsibilities. Islam and politics were discussed. It was attended by all the nobles from across the empire, hence, proving that the British appointed Sultan of Johor was not recognised by the Malays. The ceremonies also included the installation of Tengku Mahmud (later ruling as Sultan Mahmud Muzaffar) as crown prince and Tun Mutahir as bendehara-in-waiting.

In 1841, Bendahara Ali appointed Temenggong Daeng Ibrahim to replace his father, who died in 1825. The long interval was due to displeasure of the Bendahara over the affairs of Singapore. Conditions imposed during the appointment included paying a visit of fealty to the ruling Sultan Mahmud Muzaffar in Lingga. Sultan Hussein of Singapore died in 1835 and his prince Tengku Ali wished for the legitimacy granted to Temenggong Ibrahim, by the British and some Malay nobles. The British forwarded the request in 1841 to the Bendahara Ali.

After waiting since 1835 for the 'appointment' as sultan, in 1852 Tengku Ali decided to return Johor to the former Johor-Riau Empire by paying homage to Sultan Mahmud Muzaffar in Lingga. For three years Johor's empire existed once again, except Singapore which was ceded to the British. Worried by the state of affairs, the British called Tengku Ali back to Singapore on the threat of cancelling his pension. In Singapore, he was frequently visited by Sultan Mahmud Muzaffar, and their relationship was cordial.

=== End of the empire ===
The British were worried by this development and forced the 1855 treaty between Temenggong Ibrahim and Tengku Ali. In exchange for recognition as sultan, Tengku Ali agreed to "give up all of Johor". The treaty was intended to solidify the position of Temenggong Ibrahim, their key ally.

Bendahara Ali was asked by the Sultan Mahmud Muzaffar about the 1855 treaty. In his reply, the Bendahara reiterated that the Temenggong was supposed to swear fealty to his majesty and on the behaviour of Tengku Ali, the Bendehara claimed ignorance. He also reiterated that he was not a party to any discussion with the British or Dutch.

The Dutch were also very worried. It seemed that the sultan was acting on his own and would not listen to any of the Dutch-influenced Yam Tuan Muda of Riau and the Bugis nobility. It erupted into an open dispute between Sultan Mahmud Muzaffar and the Bugis nobility over the appointment of new Yam Tuan Muda of Riau. The Bugis' preferred candidate was also the Dutch choice. The sultan resented having another foreign-backed Yam Tuan Muda of Riau. It resulted in a deadlock and the sultan set sail to Singapore to calm down. It was during the Singapore trip that Mahmud Muzaffar was deposed by the Bugis nobility in 1857.

==== Breakup of the state ====
After the ousting of Mahmud Muzaffar the Bugis nobles elected the new sultan, Sulaiman Badrul Shah, the sultan of the "new" Riau-Lingga Kingdom built on the Riau remnants of the Johore Empire. The sultan signed an agreement with the Dutch. In the agreement he agreed to acknowledge the overlordship of the Dutch government among others. The Johor Empire was split into two parts with Sulaiman Badrul Shah giving up the sovereignty of his part to the Dutch. This also marked the end of the original Johor-Riau Sultanate, that descended from the Malacca Sultanate. This division remains today with Pahang and Johor in Malaysia and what was the Riau-Lingga Sultanate in Indonesia.

==== Johor and Pahang ====
Temenggong Daeng Ibrahim of Johore signed a treaty with Bendahara Tun Mutahir of Pahang in 1861. The treaty recognised the territories of Johor (mainland), the Temenggong and his descendants' right to rule it, mutual protection and mutual recognitions of Pahang and Johor. With the signing of this treaty, the remnants of the empire became two independent states, Johor and Pahang.

== Johor administration ==
The Johor Sultanate continued the system of administration previously practised in Malacca. The highest authority lay in the hands of the Yang di-Pertuan who was known as the sultan. The sultan was assisted by a body known as the Majlis Orang Kaya (Council of Rich Men) which was tasked with advising the sultan. Among them were the Bendahara, Temenggong, Laksamana, Shahbandar and Seri Bija Diraja. During the 18th century, the bendahara lived in Pahang and the Temenggong Johor in Teluk Belanga, Singapore. Each one managed the administration of their individual areas based on the level of authority bestowed upon them by the Sultan of Johor.

The Johor's empire was decentralised. It was made of four main fiefs and the sultan's territory. The fiefs were Muar and its territories under the Raja Temenggong of Muar; Pahang under the stewardship of the Bendahara; Riau under the control of Yamtuan Muda and mainland Johor and Singapore under the Temenggong. The rest of the empire were directly controlled by the sultan. The sultan resided in Lingga. All the Orang Kayas except Raja Temenggong Muar reported directly to the sultan; Raja Temenggong Muar was a suzerain recognised by the sultan.

Sultans of Johor	Reign
Malacca-Johor dynasty
Alauddin Riayat Shah II	1528–1564
Muzaffar Shah II	1564–1570
Abdul Jalil Shah I	1570–1571
Ali Jalla Abdul Jalil Shah II	1571–1597
Alauddin Riayat Shah III	1597–1615
Abdullah Ma'ayat Shah	1615–1623
Abdul Jalil Shah III	1623–1677
Ibrahim Shah	1677–1685
Mahmud Shah II	1685–1699
Bendahara dynasty
Abdul Jalil IV (Bendahara Abdul Jalil)	1699–1720
Malacca-Johor dynasty (descent)
Abdul Jalil Rahmat Shah (Raja Kecil)	1718–1722
Bendahara dynasty
Sulaiman Badrul Alam Shah	1722–1760
Abdul Jalil Muazzam Shah	1760–1761
Ahmad Riayat Shah	1761–1761
Mahmud Shah III	1761–1812
Abdul Rahman Muazzam Shah	1812–1830

== Extent of the sultanate ==
As the Johor Sultanate replaced the Malacca Sultanate, it covered most of Malacca's former territory including the southern Malay Peninsula, parts of south-eastern Sumatra and the Riau Islands and its dependencies. By 1836, Newbold writes that "Johor" occupies the territories of Muar, Batu Pahat, Pontian, Sedili and Johor Lama. Also in the early 19th century, the Tuhfat al-Nafis and the Hikayat Negeri Johor also includes Riau as part of the territory of Johor. The administrative centre of the empire was at various times at Sayong Pinang, Kota Kara, Seluyut, Johor Lama, Batu Sawar, Kota Tinggi and Pahang. All on mainland Johor, Pahang and later at Riau and Lingga.

=== Capitals ===
The Johor Sultanate established a series of shifting capitals as it navigated conflict and the changing political landscape. From around the 1530s, Sayong Pinang served as an early center of power until 1536, when the capital was moved to Johor Lama until 1564 when it was sacked by Aceh forces, forcing the capital to move to Bukit Seluyut (along the Johor River) from 1564 to 1570. The capital returned to Johor Lama from 1570 until 1587 when it was attacked and sacked by the Portuguese, leading to a move to Batu Sawar, a major center of regional trade along the Johor River, from 1587 to 1618. The capital shifted to Lingga in 1618 until 1625, from this time on, Johor had no fixed capital until 1640, when it returned again to Batu Sawar. The town was eventually attacked by Jambi forces in 1675 during the Johor-Jambi war and the court settled temporarily in Pahang (1675–1680) and later in Riau (1680–1688) until Kota Tinggi became the capital in 1688 until 1700, followed by Pancur from 1700 to 1708, then to Riau from 1708 to 1715 and again back to Pancur from 1715 to 1720, then again to Riau.

== See also ==
- Bendahara dynasty
- Founding years of modern Singapore
- History of the Malay kings of Singapore
- Malacca Sultanate
- Riau-Lingga Sultanate
- House of Temenggong
