= Abdullah Ma'ayat Shah of Johor =

Sultan of Johor (1615–1623)

Sultan Abdullah Ma'ayat Shah

Sultan of Johor
- Reign: 1615–1623
- Predecessor: Alauddin Riayat Shah III
- Successor: Abdul Jalil Shah III
- Issue: Raja Bajau
- House: Melaka
- Father: Sultan Muzaffar Shah II
- Religion: Sunni Islam

Sultan Abdullah Ma'ayat Shah was Sultan of Johor from 1615 to 1623. Before he became sultan of Johor, Abdullah Ma'ayat Shah was also known as Raja Bongsu, Raja Seberang or Raja di Hilir. Kota Seberang was described as the personal "fiefdom" of Raja Bongsu by Admiral Cornelis Matelief de Jonge. He controlled the settlement which was located almost straight across the Johor River from the royal administrative center and capital Batu Sawar. He is also said to have controlled areas around the Sambas River on the island of Borneo.

== Biography ==
According to the testimony of Dutch Admiral Cornelis Matelief de Jonge, Raja Bongsu was one of four surviving sons of Raja Ali bin Abdul Jalil (alias Raja Omar) of Johor. The other remaining male siblings and half-siblings were described by Admiral Matelief as Raja Siak, Raja Laut, and Alauddin Riayat Shah III. The latter ruled as the sixth sultan of Johor between the death of his father Raja Ali Jalla in 1597 and the Acehnese attack on Johor in 1613.

In 1613, Raja Bongsu was one of the prisoners taken back to Aceh after the invasion of Johor by Sultan Iskandar Muda. He was married to one of Iskandar's sisters, and returned to Johor as the new sultan. Raja Bongsu was subsequently enthroned as Abdullah Ma'ayat Shah of Johor. His half-brother Alauddin Riayat Shah III who had fallen from power at the time of Iskandar Muda's offensive on Johor in 1613 had fled to Lingga and probably died there in or around 1615.

In 1618, Abdullah Ma'ayat Shah moved to Lingga and gained the support of Orang Laut and the Dutch to wage a war against Aceh. He later divorced his wife who was also a sister of Iskandar Muda, a move that further angered the sultan. He spent most of his reign as a wanderer, pursued from town to town and island to island by the Acehnese. He died in the Tambelan Archipelago in March 1623.

In 1621, Abdullah Ma'ayat Shah had a son with a Jambian princess, Raja Bajau. After Abdullah's death in 1623, she returned to Jambi with her son. Abdul Jalil Shah was then put on the throne of Pahang by the Laksamana, but only under the condition that Raja Bajau succeed him when he reached his majority. Although this was not carried out, as compensation, Abdul Jalil Shah gave Raja Bajau the title of Raja Muda, or "heir-apparent".

== Reign and foreign relations ==
In 1603 Raja Bongsu was instrumental in forging early diplomatic relations with the Dutch by lending assistance to Admiral Jacob van Heemskerck on 25 February 1603 in attacking and plundering the Portuguese carrack Santa Catarina, in the Johor River estuary off present-day Singapore. He was also responsible for sending one of the first diplomatic missions of a Malay ruler to the Dutch Republic in the same year. Headed by Megat Mansur, the Johor embassy sailed to Europe on the ships of Admiral van Heemskerck in 1603. Megat Mansur did not survive the voyage, but other members of the Johor embassy did and returned with the fleet under the command of Admiral Cornelis Matelief de Jonge in 1606. In that year, Raja Bongsu formally ratified two treaties with the Dutch (dated 17 May and 23 September 1606) and signed himself as the co-ruler of Johor. He also lent active assistance to Admiral Matelief during his seaborne attack on Portuguese Malacca on or around May 1606.

In early 1609 Raja Bongsu received Dutch Admiral Pieter Willemsz. Verhoeff at Batu Sawar. On this occasion Johann Verken, one of the German officers serving in Verhoeff's fleet, described the physical appearance of Raja Bongsu. He wrote that the Raja was "a young man in his 30s. In his appearance and body a well-proportioned person, rather tall, articulate, and fair-skinned both on his body and on his face".

After the Portuguese had imposed an economically crippling blockade on the Johor River for much of 1609, Raja Bongsu was forced (through the machinations of his half-brother Raja Siak) to sign a peace treaty with Portuguese Malacca in October 1610.

Abdullah Ma'ayat Shah of Johor Malacca-Johor dynasty
Regnal titles
Preceded by Alauddin Riayat Shah III	Sultan of Johor; 1615–1623	Succeeded by Abdul Jalil Shah III
