= Abdul Jalil Shah III of Johor =

Sultan of Johor (1623–1677) and Pahang (1615–1617)

Abdul Jalil Shah III عبد الجليل شاه

Sultan of Pahang
- Reign: 1615–1617
- Predecessor: Alauddin Riayat Shah
- Successor: Interregnum until 1623 then Pahang united with the crown of Johor

Sultan of Johor
- Reign: 1623–1677
- Predecessor: Abdullah Ma'ayat Shah of Johor
- Successor: Ibrahim Shah
- House: Malacca
- Father: Alauddin Riayat Shah III
- Religion: Sunni Islam

Sultan Abdul Jalil Shah III ibni Almarhum Sultan Alauddin Riayat Shah III was the Sultan of Pahang and Johor, as Abdul Jalil Shah II, who reigned from 1615 to 1617 and 1623 to 1677 respectively. Known as Raja Bujang before his accession, he was a son of the 5th Sultan of Johor, Alauddin Riayat Shah III and a nephew of the 6th Sultan of Johor, Abdullah Ma'ayat Shah. He was the last Sultan of Pahang of the Malacca dynasty to rule Pahang independently from Johor until the independence of the Pahang Kingdom.

== Ruler of Pahang and Sultan of Johor-Pahang ==
In 1615, Alauddin Riayat Shah III of Johor signed a peace treaty with Portuguese Malacca, and as a sign of gratitude, the Portuguese recognised Raja Bujang as the ruler of Pahang, replacing Alauddin Riayat Shah of Pahang who had been deposed 1615 by the Johorese. However, the appointment was not recognised by Sultan Iskandar Muda of Aceh, which later invaded Pahang and forced Raja Bujang to flee to the islands of Lingga. At the same time, the Acehnese waged war with the new Sultan of Johor, Abdullah Ma'ayat Shah who was also forced to flee to Lingga. As the Acehnese attacks continued, Raja Bujang and Sultan Abdullah fled once again to Tambelan Archipelago. When Sultan Abdullah died in 1623, Aceh reconciled with Raja Bujang and appointed him as the new Sultan of Johor and Pahang.

== Invasion of Malacca ==
The strength of Aceh was brought to an end with a disastrous campaign against Malacca in 1629, when the combined Portuguese and Johor forces managed to destroy the fleet and 19,000 Acehnese troops according to the Portuguese account. Johor later grew stronger and formed an alliance with the Dutch to attack Portuguese Malacca and conquered it on January 14, 1641, ending the triangular war. In the following month, Iskandar Thani of Aceh died and was succeeded by Queen Taj ul-Alam. Her reign marks the beginning of the decline of Aceh's position as a regional power.

In 1641, Sultan Abdul Jalil Shah III moved to mainland Johor and established his new capital in Makam Tauhid. He spent two years of his reign in Makam Tauhid before he crossed the Damar river to establish his new capital in Pasir Raja (also known as Batu Sawar) in October 1642.

Jambi emerged as a regional economic and political power in the early 17th century. Initially there was an attempt at an alliance between Johor and Jambi with a promised marriage between the heir Raja Muda and daughter of the Pengeran of Jambi. However, the Raja Muda instead married the daughter of the Laksamana, who was concerned about the dilution of power from such an alliance and so offered his own daughter for marriage. The alliance broke down, and war was fought between 1666 and 1679, during which Jambi successfully sacked Johor's capital Batu Sawar in 1673. Sultan Abdul Jalil Shah III fled to Pahang and ordered his Laksamana to direct invasions alongside the orang laut against Jambi from his base in Riau, restoring Johor's status. He made Pahang the centre of his administration for four years before he died in Pekan in 1677.

Abdul Jalil Shah III of Johor House of Malacca
Regnal titles
Preceded by Alauddin Riayat Shah	Sultan of Pahang; 1615–1617	Pahang united with the crown of Johor
Abdul Jalil Shah III of Johor Malacca-Johor dynasty
Regnal titles
Preceded by Abdullah Ma'ayat Shah	Sultan of Johor; 1623–1677	Succeeded by Ibrahim Shah
