= Johor Lama =

Coordinates: 1°34′26.4″N 104°1′19.2″E

- Mukim
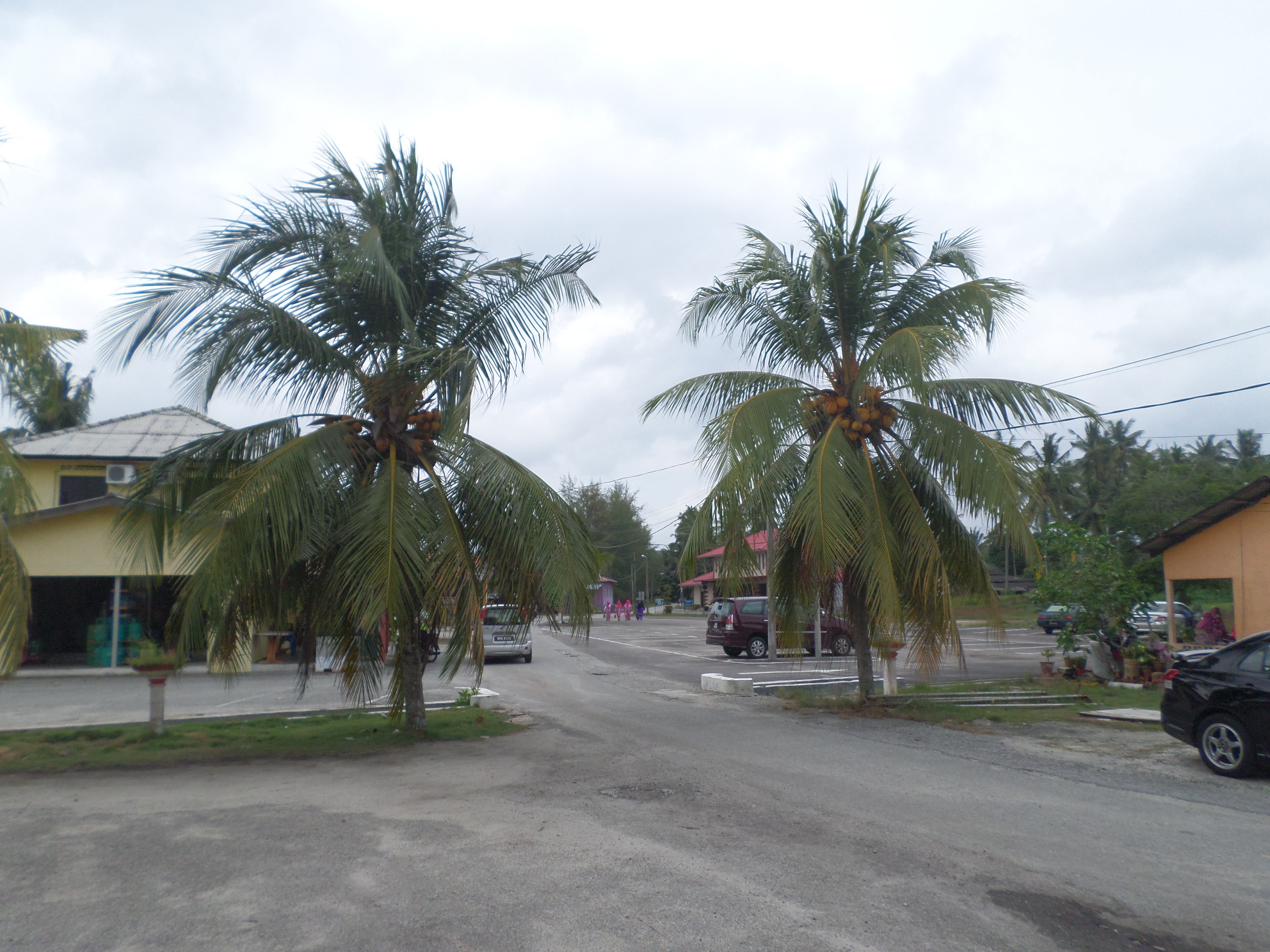
- Interactive map of Johor Lama
- Country: Malaysia
- State: Johor
- District: Kota Tinggi

Area
  - Total: 19.3 km^{2} (7.5 sq mi)

Johor Lama is a mukim in Kota Tinggi District, Johor, Malaysia. It is situated on the banks of Johor River. It was once a thriving port and the old capital of the Johor Sultanate.

== History ==
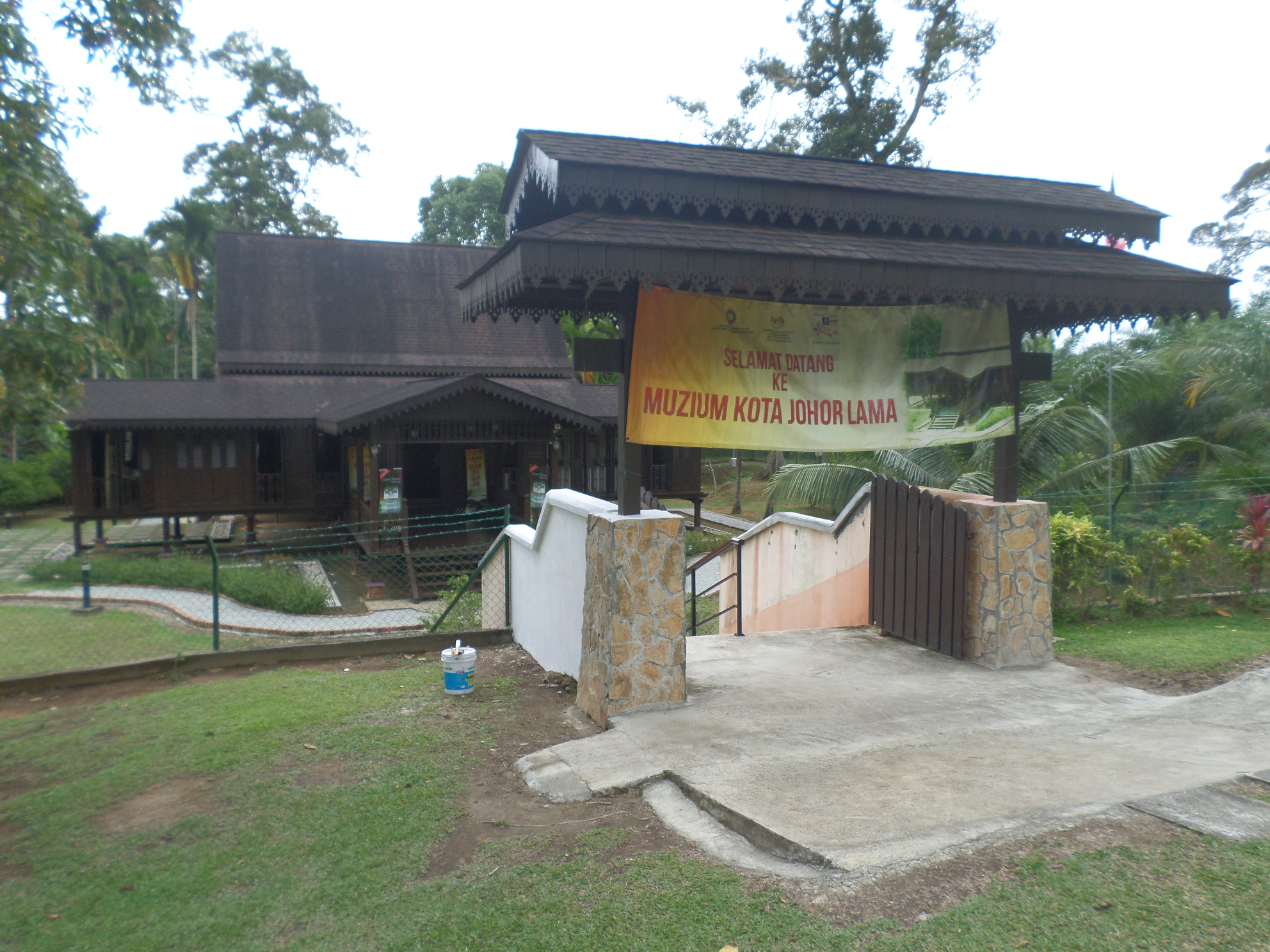
Kota Johor Lama Museum

Johor Lama is located near the site of the former capital of the Johor Sultanate, Kota Batu, which was established by Alauddin Riayat Shah II shortly after the fall of the Sultanate of Malacca in 1511. Kota Batu was sacked and burnt by the Acehnese in 1564, and Alauddin was taken to Aceh and killed. The capital was then moved to Bukit Seluyut for a few years.

In the early 1570s, the sultan Ali Jalla returned to the Kota Batu area and reestablished the capital at Johor Lama. The Johor Sultanate had initially formed an alliance with the Portuguese against the Acehnese, however Ali Jalla confiscated the cargo of a Portuguese ship that had wrecked on the mouth of the Johor River. In response, the Portuguese stopped traders from Melaka from trading with Johor. Ali Jalla then forced ships to go Johor Lama, and attacked Melaka in January 1587. In retaliation, the Portuguese blockaded the Johor River, and later in the year led by Dom Paulo Lima de Pereira, launched an attack on Johor Lama. The fortified city was defended by 12,000 men, but the Portuguese prevailed and destroyed the fort. The capital of Johor was then moved to Batu Sawar further up the Johor River.

Johor Lama was later rebuilt but again destroyed in 1604 by the Portuguese. For some time it continued to be used as a port for larger ships where goods could then be moved upstream to towns such as Batu Sawar.

== Geography ==
Johor Lama in Kota Tinggi District

The mukim spans over an area of 19.3 km^{2}.

== Tourist attractions ==
- Kota Johor Lama Museum
