= Ali Jalla Abdul Jalil Shah II of Johor =

Sultan of Johor from 1571 to 1597

- Sultan of Johor
- Reign: 1571–1597
- Predecessor: Abdul Jalil I
- Successor: Alauddin Riayat Shah III
- Spouse: Fatima Raja
- Issue: Abdul Jalil I
- Dynasty: Malacca-Johor dynasty

Ali Jalla Abdul Jalil Shah II (died 1597) was the Sultan of Johor from 1571 to 1597.

Ali Jalla Abdul Jalil Shah II married Fatima Raja, sister of Sultan of Johor Muzaffar II of Johor. On Muzaffar II's death, Ali Jalla and Fatima's son Abdul Jalil I of Johor became the sultan. He died less than a year later and Ali Jalla was then made sultan.

During Ali Jalla Abdul Jalil Shah II's reign, he oversaw the reconstruction of the sultanate's former eponymous capital and its transformation into a trading port after it was destroyed by the Aceh Sultanate in 1564.

Initially, he repulsed a Portuguese attack on Johor in 1586. However, in 1587, the city was besieged, sacked, and razed by the Portuguese.

Ali Jalla Abdul Jalil Shah II of Johor Malacca-Johor dynasty Died: 1597
Regnal titles
| Preceded by Abdul Jalil I | Sultan of Johor; 1571–1597 | Succeeded by Alauddin Riayat Shah III |

== Sources ==
- article translated from Malay by google translate on the Sultans of Johor
