= Alauddin Riayat Shah III of Johor =

Sultan of Johor (1597–1615)

Sultan Alauddin Riayat Shah III
- Sultan of Johor
- Reign: 1597–1615
- Predecessor: Ali Jalla Abdul Jalil Shah II
- Successor: Abdullah Ma'ayat Shah
- House: Melaka
- Father: Ali Jalla Abdul Jalil Shah II
- Mother: Raja Fatimah
- Religion: Sunni Islam

Sultan Alauddin Riayat Shah III was the Sultan of Johor and reigned from 1597 to 1615. He resided at the new capital of Johor at Batu Sawar, but later moved his administration to Pasir Raja around 1609. In 1612, at the instigation of his co-ruler Abdullah, (better known from period historical documents as Raja Bongsu or Raja Seberang; who after 1613 ruled as Abdullah Ma'ayat Shah) and Bendahara Tun Sri Lanang oversaw the editorial and compilation process of the Malay Annals, one of the most important Malay literary works.

In 1606 Alauddin allied with the Dutch to fight the Portuguese in an attempt to oust them from Malacca in a joint military campaign. To this end he ratified two treaties with the Dutch Admiral Cornelis Matelieff de Jonge in May and September 1606. Following a crippling blockade of the Johor River in 1608 and 1609, he signed a peace agreement with the Portuguese in October 1610. His fate and death remain uncertain. Some claim that he fled Batu Sawar at the time of the Acehnese attack in 1613 and died in exile on Lingga while others claim that he had been captured twice by the Acehnese between 1613 and 1615 and subsequently sentenced to death around 1615. He is buried in Kota Tinggi, Johor.

== See also ==
- Malay-Portuguese conflicts

Alauddin Riayat Shah III of Johor Malacca-Johor dynasty
Regnal titles
Preceded by Ali Jalla Abdul Jalil Shah II	Sultan of Johor; 1597–1615	Succeeded by Abdullah Ma'ayat Shah
