= Muzaffar II of Johor =

Muzaffar Shah II
- Sultan of Johor
- Reign: 1564–1570
- Coronation: 1564
- Predecessor: Alauddin Riayat Shah II
- Successor: Abdul Jalil I
- Born: 1546
- Died: 1570 (aged 24)
- Spouse: Tun Mas Jiwa, Tun Trang
- Father: Alauddin Riayat Shah II
- Religion: Sunni Islam

Sultan Muzaffar Shah II (1546–1570) was the second Sultan of Johor. He was known as Raja Muda Perdana before he succeeded the throne. He was installed as Sultan of Johor in 1564 by the Acehnese upon the death of his father, Sultan Alauddin Riayat Shah II, who died shortly after he was captured and brought back to Aceh after the Acehnese invasion of Johor.

Muzaffar II moved his capital to Kota Seluyut in 1565 from Johor Lama to assert his independence from the Acehnese. He died of poison in 1570 and was succeeded by Sultan Abdul Jalil Shah I.

== Personal life ==
He had three wives. His first wife was Tun Mas Jiwa, daughter of the Temenggong, Tun Hassan. His second wife was Tun Trang, daughter of Tun Ali, Seri Nara Diraja of Pahang, and Tun Fatimah. Tun Trang bore him a son, Raja Radin. His third wife was the former wife of Sultan Ali Jalla Abdul Jalil Shah II and daughter of Sultan Husain Ali Riayat Shah of Aceh.

Muzaffar II of Johor Malacca-Johor dynasty Born: 1546 Died: 1570
Regnal titles
Preceded by Alauddin Riayat II	Sultan of Johor; 1564–1570	Succeeded by Abdul Jalil I
