= Abdul Jalil I of Johor =

Abdul Jalil I
- Sultan of Johor
- Reign: Sultan of Johor: 1570–1571
- Predecessor: Muzaffar II
- Successor: Ali Jalla Abdul Jalil Shah II
- Died: 1571
- Father: Ali Jalla Abdul Jalil Shah II
- Religion: Sunni Islam

Sultan Abdul Jalil I (died 1571) was the Sultan of Johor from 1570 to 1571.

Abdul Jalil I was the nephew of his predecessor Muzaffar II of Johor. Abdul Jalil I died after only a year of rule due to poisoning according to some.

He died in 1571 and was succeeded as sultan by his father Ali Jalla Abdul Jalil Shah II.

== Sources ==
- "Sejarah Kesultanan Negeri Johor" [History of the Sultanate of Johor State]. Portal Rasmi Kerajaan Negeri Johor Darul Ta'zim (in Malay). Government of Johor. 8 July 2008.

Abdul Jalil I of Johor Malacca-Johor dynasty Born: 1562 Died: 1571
Regnal titles
Preceded by Muzaffar II	Sultan of Johor; 1570–1571	Succeeded by Ali Jalla Abdul Jalil Shah II
