= Alauddin Riayat Shah II of Johor =

Alauddin Riayat Shah II
- Sultan of Johor
- Reign: 1528–1564
- Coronation: 1528
- Predecessor: Mahmud Shah (Malacca)
- Successor: Muzaffar Shah II
- Died: 1564; Acheh
- Spouse: Princess Kesuma Dewi
- Issue: Muzaffar Shah II
Posthumous name
- Marhum Syahid di Acheh
- Father: Mahmud Shah (Malacca)
- Mother: Tun Fatimah
- Religion: Sunni Islam

Sultan Alauddin Riayat Shah II ibni Almarhum Sultan Mahmud Shah (died c. 1564) was the first Sultan of Johor and ruled from 1528 to 1564. He founded the Johor Sultanate following the fall of Malacca to the Portuguese in 1511. He was the second son of Mahmud Shah of Malacca. Thus, Johor was a successor state of Malacca and Johor's sultans are descended from and followed the numbering system of Malacca. Throughout his reign, he faced constant threats from the Portuguese as well as the emerging Aceh Sultanate.

== Founding of Johor and Portuguese threats ==
In 1529, Alauddin Riayat founded his first capital in Hujung Tanah, known as Pekan Tua, 11 km upriver from Kota Tinggi, following the death of his father. A river fort, Kota Kara, was also founded down the river. In 1535, about 400 Portuguese troops led by Estêvão da Gama invaded Johor. Kota Kara was bombarded but the Malays withstood the attack. After a few days, Portuguese troops landed and bombarded the fort but they also had to retreat. Encouraged by this initial success, the Malays left their fort and launched a counter-attack against the Portuguese. However, the Malays were scattered by the crossfire of the Portuguese which resulted in the Portuguese capturing and burning the fort.

Alauddin Riayat retreated up the Johor River to Sayong Pinang. His official, Seri Nara Diraja, died in Sayong Pinang. Alauddin Riayat returned to Pekan Tua after a short period and rebuilt it. Pekan Tua was attacked by 400 Portuguese troops under Estêvão da Gama again because his brother, Paulo da Gama, and about 30 other Portuguese troops were killed by Malays. Following this attack, a peace treaty was signed between Johor and the Portuguese.

In 1540, Alauddin Riayat Shah moved his capital to Johor Lama, closer to the estuary of the Johor River.

== Acehnese threats ==
Johor was also threatened by Aceh, on the northern tip of Sumatra. In 1539, Aru, Johor's vassal state on the east coast of Sumatra, was attacked by a fleet of 160 ships with 12,000 soldiers composed of Acehnese, Malaccan Malays, Malabaris, Gujaratis, and Turks. Alauddin Riayat gathered a fleet with aid from his allies, Perak and Siak, and attacked Aru in 1540. He reconquered Aru, leaving only 14 Acehnese ships afloat and thousands of Acehnese troops dead at the Battle of Sungai Paneh. In 1564, the Sultan of Aceh, Alauddin al-Kahar, defeated Aru and expelled the Johoreans from Aru. Alauddin al-Kahar, then launched an attack on Johor Lama from Aru. The fort and town was leveled and Alauddin Riayat was captured and brought back to Aceh. He later died from sickness and was given the posthumous title, Marhum Syahid di Acheh. He was succeeded by his son, Muzaffar Shah II.

== Personal life ==
He married Princess Kesuma Dewi of Pahang, the daughter of Mansur Shah of Pahang.

Alauddin Riayat Shah II of Johor Malacca-Johor dynasty Died: 1564
Regnal titles
Preceded by Mahmud Shah	Sultan of Johor; 1528–1564	Succeeded by Muzaffar Shah II
