= Attack on Bintan (1521) =

16th c. military engagement

- Part of Malay–Portuguese conflicts
Date	October 1521
Location	Bintan
Result	Malaccan victory

Belligerents
Portuguese Empire	Sultanate of Malacca

Commanders and leaders
Jorge de Albuquerque; Antonio de Brito	Mahmud Shah

Strength
600 men 18 vessels	Unknown

Casualties and losses
20 men killed several wounded one brigantine lost	Unknown

The Attack on Bintan in 1521 was an engagement between the Malaccans and the Portuguese who attacked the island in order to destroy Mahmud Shah of Malacca's base in Bintan, however, the attack was successfully fended off.

== Background ==
In 1511, the governor of Portuguese India Afonso de Albuquerque captured the Malay city of Malacca. The Sultan of Malacca Mahmud Shah fled with his forces to Bintan Island and established his rule there. He built a new city and fleet there, and continuously harassed Portuguese Malacca and its shipping, Mahmud never gave up the idea of recapturing Malacca from the Portuguese and he constantly attacked Malacca with raids from 1517 to 1520, Sultan Mahmud stationed his chiefs in Pago close to Malacca, which was destroyed by the Portuguese in 1520.

== Attack ==
The destruction of Pago did not stop the raids. In 1521, the Captain of Malacca Jorge de Albuquerque made preparations to attack the island of Bintan, he mustered a force of 600 men and 18 ships he was joined by Antonio de Brito who was already in Pasai reinforcing the fortress with 3 ships and leaving some men there in case of attack Bintan was about 40 leagues from Malacca, the island was difficult to approach and well fortified, having two strong fortresses at its river prevented any access of ships. The Portuguese reached Bintan in October, Jorge, finding it impossible to get his ships up the river, ordered his men to land and attack one of the forts. The rising waters and the stiff resistance of the garrison led to the attack being repulsed with 20 Portuguese killed and a great number wounded. With a loss of a brigatine, the attack was abandoned and the Portuguese withdrew from the island.

== Aftermath ==
The Portuguese defeat boosted the moral of Mahmud Shah's forces who proceeded to attack any Portuguese ships spotted. Ships were captured at Pahang and Java with many Portuguese crews being killed. The laksamana Hang Nadim and the bendahara Paduka Raja molested Portuguese shipping, at one instance, the Portuguese who landed in Pahang unaware of the ties with the Johor Sultanate many of them were killed and the rest were captured and blown up with guns, the Portuguese would attempt to capture the island in 1523 and 1524, however, they would be repulsed with heavy losses.

The Portuguese would succeed in capturing the island in 1526 putting an end to Mahmud Shah's raids.

== See also ==
- Battle of Muar River
- Battle of Pago
- Siege of Bintan
- Battle of Lingga
