= Battle of Muar River =

1523 battle in the Malayan Peninsular

- Part of Malay–Portuguese conflicts
Date	April 1523
Location	Muar River, Negeri Sembilan, Malaysia
Result	Malayan victory

Belligerents
Portuguese Empire	Bintan Sultanate; Pahang Sultanate

Commanders and leaders
Jorge de Albuquerque	Unnamed Laksamana

Strength
Unknown	80 vessels

Casualties and losses
65 men killed 3 ships lost	Unknown

The Battle of Muar River took place in 1523 between the allied Malaccan-Pahang navy and the Portuguese navy. The battle ended in favor of the Malayans, as they defeated the Portuguese in the Muar River.

== Battle ==
In 1521, having defeated a Portuguese attempt to capture and destroy the Sultan of Malacca Mahmud Shah's base, attacks on Portuguese shipping increased from that time onwards, which laid a heavy burden on Portuguese operations. In April 1523, the Malaccans, allied with the Pahang Sultanate launched a raid against the Portuguese and occupied Malacca with a large navy of 80 vessels led by the Laksamana.

Once the Malayans established themselves in the Muar River, a lone Portuguese vessel sailing from Malacca spotted the large Malayan navy about 10 leagues away and quickly returned to Malacca to inform its captain Jorge de Albuquerque; who decided to face them in the sea and send ships there, however, the Portuguese encountered a heavy storm which forced them to head to the Muar River.

The storm was powerful enough that it forced three Portuguese ships – separated from the rest – to go far into the river where they met the Malayan camp, where they were surrounded and attacked with all 65 Portuguese on board being killed. The rest of the Portuguese navy withdrew to Malacca, and the Malayans, satisfied with their victory returned to Bintan.

== See also ==
- Attack on Bintan (1521)
- Battle of Pago
- Siege of Bintan
