= Capture of Malacca (1511) =

Portuguese military conquest

- Part of Malay–Portuguese conflicts
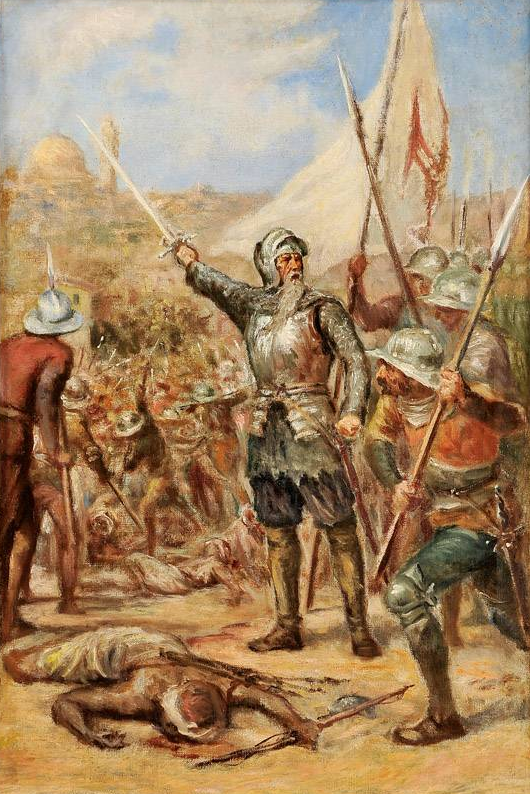
- "The Conquest of Malacca, 1511" by Ernesto Condeixa (1858–1933).
| Date | 21 Jumādā I 917; 15 August 1511 |
| Location | Malacca (present-day part of Malaysia) 2°12′20″N 102°15′22″E |
| Result | Portuguese victory; Destruction of the Malacca Sultanate; independence of Kampar, Pahang, and others |
| Territorial changes | Establishment of Portuguese Malacca |

Belligerents
| Portuguese Empire | Malacca Sultanate |

Commanders and leaders
| (Portuguese Empire) Afonso de Albuquerque | Mahmud Shah |

Strength
| 1,500 Portuguese soldiers 800 Chinese and Indian auxiliaries Up to 400 guns 11 carracks 3 caravels 2 galleys | 20,000 men 8,000 firearms and cannons (Note: While post-conquest accounts mentioned Malaccan artillery numbering about 2000–8000 pieces, the number employed in the fighting was much smaller.); 20 elephants |

Casualties and losses
| 28 dead | Unknown |

The governor of Portuguese India Afonso de Albuquerque conquered the city of Malacca in 1511.

The port city of Malacca controlled the narrow, strategic Strait of Malacca, through which all seagoing trade between China and India was concentrated. The capture of Malacca was the result of a plan by King Manuel I of Portugal, who since 1505 had intended to beat the Castilians to the Far-East, and Albuquerque's own project of establishing firm foundations for Portuguese India, alongside Hormuz, Goa, and Aden, to ultimately control trade and thwart Muslim shipping in the Indian Ocean.

Having started sailing from Cochin in April 1511, the expedition would not have been able to turn around due to contrary monsoon winds. Had the enterprise failed, the Portuguese could not hope for reinforcements and would have been unable to return to their bases in India. At the time it was the farthest territorial conquest in history.

== Background ==
The first Portuguese references to Malacca appear after Vasco da Gama's return from his expedition to Calicut which opened a direct route to India around the Cape of Good Hope. It was described as a city that was a 40-day journey from India, where clove, nutmeg, porcelains, and silks were sold. It was supposedly ruled by a sovereign who could gather 10,000 men for war and was Christian. Since then, King Manuel showed an interest in making contact with Malacca, believing it to be at, or at least close to, the antimeridian of Tordesillas. In 1505 Dom Francisco de Almeida was dispatched by King Manuel I of Portugal as the first Viceroy of Portuguese India, tasked to discover its precise location, among other things.

Almeida, however, was unable to dedicate resources to the enterprise and sent only two undercover Portuguese envoys in August 1506, Francisco Pereira and Estevão de Vilhena, aboard a Muslim merchantship. The mission was aborted once they were detected and nearly lynched on the Coromandel Coast, narrowly making it back to Cochin by November.

=== City ===
Malacca was founded at the start of the 15th century with all trade between China and India passing through the city. As a result of its ideal position, the city harboured many communities of merchants which included Arabs, Persians, Turks, Armenians, Birmanese, Bengali, Siamese, Peguans, and Luzonians, the four most influential being the Muslim Gujaratis and Javanese, Hindus from the Coromandel Coast, and Chinese. According to the Portuguese apothecary Tomé Pires, who lived in Malacca between 1512 and 1514, as many as 84 dialects were spoken in Malacca. The Portuguese factor Rui de Araújo said it had 10,000 homes. While Albuquerque estimated a population of 100,000, modern estimates place the population of the city at about 40,000. Damião de Góis estimated a lower population of 30,000. Malacca kept a group of captured cannibals from Daru (Note: The kingdom of Aru in Sumatra. Duarte Barbosa mentioned Ara, Aru, and Haru. Ramusio recorded Auru, while Ribero's map mentioned Recandaru.) to whom the perpetrators of serious crimes were fed.

The city however was built on swampy grounds and surrounded by inhospitable tropical forest, and needed to import everything for its sustenance, such as vital rice, supplied by the Javanese. To supply its population, Malacca used at least 100 junks which annually imported rice from various locations: about 50–60 junks from Java, 30 from Siam, and 20 from Pegu. Malacca was mainly a trading city without any substantial agricultural hinterlands. Ma Huan noted in the prior century: "All is sandy, saltish land. The climate is hot by day, cold by night. The fields are infertile and the crops poor; (and) the people seldom practice agriculture".

Malacca had about 10,000 buildings but most of them were made of straw, and only about 500 were made from adobe. They also lacked proper fortifications. Malacca had no wall except for bamboo stockades that were erected for temporary defense. This type of city was similar to Johor, Brunei, and Aceh. The richer merchants kept their trade goods by storing them in a gedong (godown) or stone warehouse, which were built partly below ground level. Ma Huan wrote:

Whenever the treasure-ships of the Middle Kingdom (China) arrived there, they at once erected a line of stockading, like a city-wall, and set up towers for the watch-drums at four gates; at night they had patrols of police carrying bells; inside, again, they erected a second stockade, like a small city-wall, (within which) they constructed warehouses and granaries; (and) all the money and provisions were stored in them.

According to Brás de Albuquerque, the son of Afonso de Albuquerque:

The Kingdom of Malacca is confined on one part by the Kingdom of Kedah and on the other by the Kingdom of Pahang and is 100 leagues long in coastline and 10 leagues into the land to a mountain range which it parted with the Kingdom of Siam. All this land was once subject to the Kingdom of Siam until about ninety years prior (to the arrival of Afonso de Albuquerque to those parts) [...]

— Brás de Albuquerque, in Comentários do Grande Afonso de Albuquerque

== First contact with the Portuguese ==
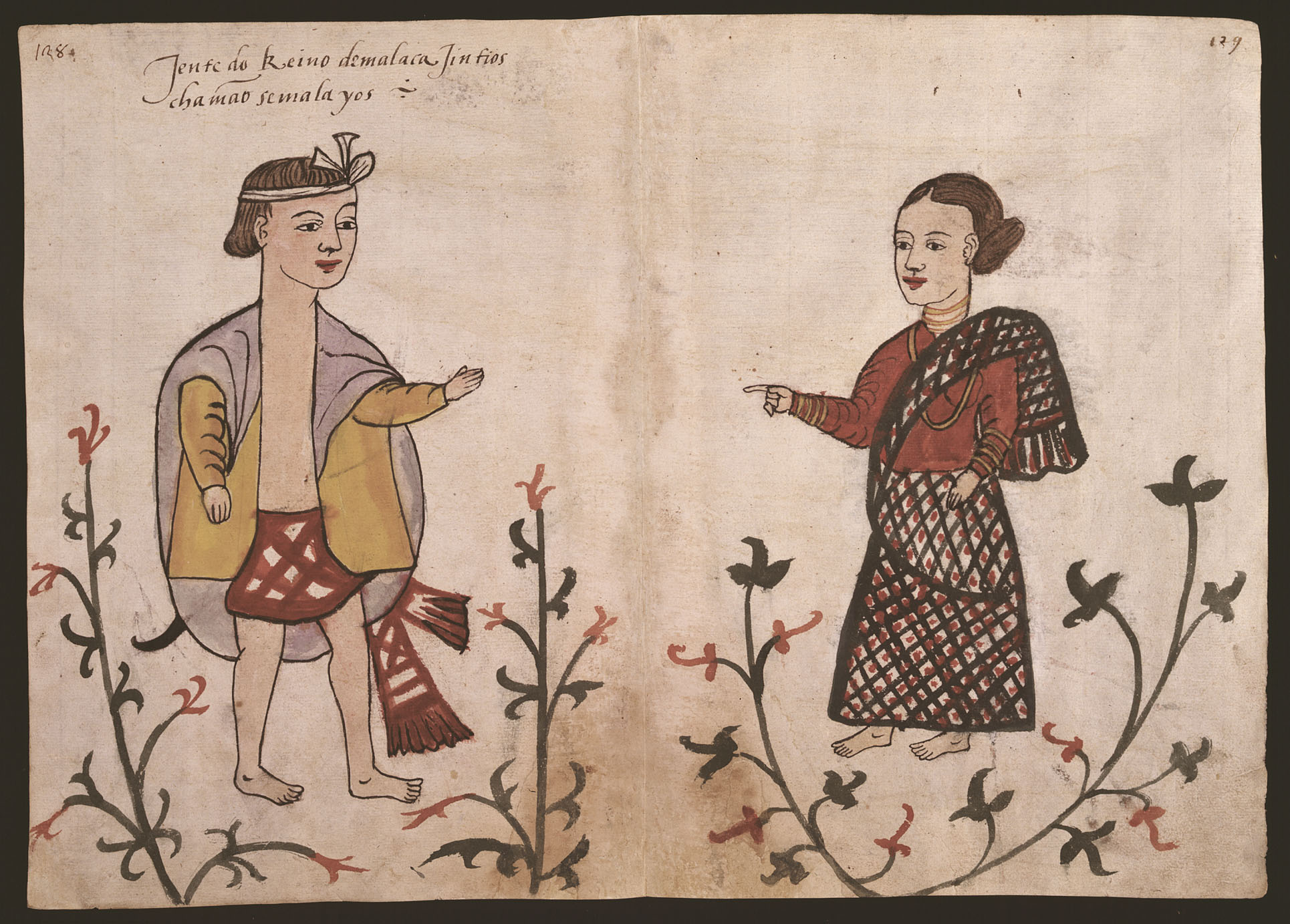
Portuguese watercolour of Malayan people of Malacca, c. 1540, featured in the Códice Casanatense

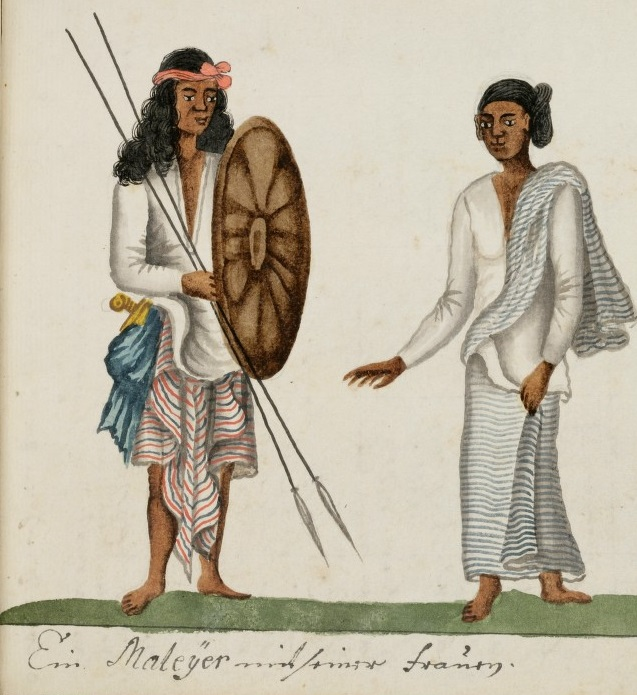
An illustration of a Malay couple, from Reise nach Batavia, between 1669 and 1682

Unimpressed with Almeida's results, in April 1508 King Manuel dispatched a fleet directly to Malacca, composed of four ships under the command of Diogo Lopes de Sequeira, who was also tasked with charting Madagascar and gathering information on the Chinese. Sequeira received royal orders specifically instructing him to obtain permission to open a trading post diplomatically and trade peacefully, not to respond to any provocations and not to open fire unless fired upon:

We order and command that you should do no damage or harm at all parts you reach, and rather that all should receive honour, favour, hospitality and fair trade from you, for our service so demands it in these beginnings. And though something may be committed against you in your venture, and you might be in you right to cause harm, dissimulate it as best you can, showing that you wish not but peace and friendship, for we demand it of you. However should you be attacked, or deceived in such a manner that it may seem to you that they wished to do you harm, then you shall do all damage and harm as you can to those who sought to commit it against you, and in no other situation shall you do war or harm.

— Letter of King Manuel I of Portugal to Diogo Lopes de Sequeira, February 1508.

By April 1509, the fleet was in Cochin and Almeida, incorporated another carrack into the fleet to strengthen it. The decision was not entirely innocent, as aboard traveled several supporters of Almeida's political rival, Afonso de Albuquerque. Among its crewmen was also Ferdinand Magellan.

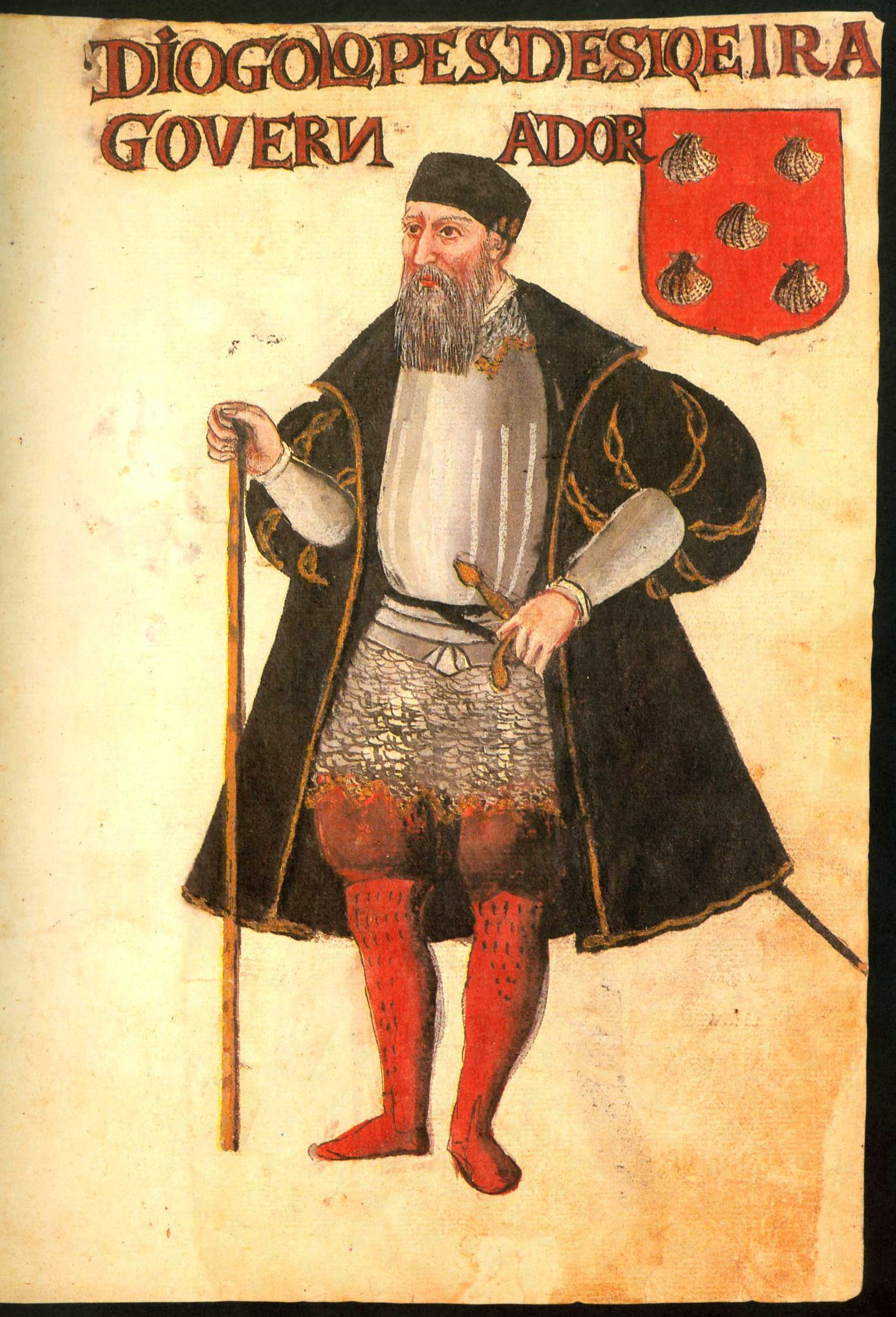
Diogo Lopes de Sequeira.

During the voyage, he was well treated by the kings of Pedir and Pasai who sent him presents. Sequeira erected crosses at both places. He cast anchor in the port of Malacca, where he terrified the people by the thunder of his cannon so that every one hastened on board their ships to endeavour to defend themselves. A boat came off with a message from the town, to ask who they were.

The expedition arrived in Malacca in September 1509 and immediately Sequeira sought to contact the Chinese merchants in the harbour. They invited him aboard one of their trade junks and received him very well for dinner and arranged a meeting with Sultan Mahmud. The Sultan promptly granted the Portuguese authorization to establish a feitoria and provided a vacant building for that purpose. However, wary of the threat that the Portuguese posed to their interests, the powerful merchant communities of Muslim Gujaratis and Javanese convinced Sultan Mahmud and the Bendahara to betray and capture the Portuguese.

Sequeira in the meantime was so convinced of the Sultan's amiability that he disregarded the information that Duarte Fernandes, a New Christian who spoke Parsi, obtained from a Persian innkeeper about the ongoing preparations to destroy the fleet, confirmed even by the Chinese merchants. He was playing chess aboard his flagship when the Malaccan fleet, disguised as merchants, ambushed the Portuguese ships. The Portuguese repelled every boarding attempt, but faced with the sheer number of Malaccan ships and unable to land any forces to rescue those Portuguese who had stayed in the feitoria, de Sequeira decided to sail back to India before the monsoon started and left them stranded in Southeast Asia. Before departing he sent a message to the Sultan and the Bendahara in the form of two captives each with an arrow through their skull as a testimony to what would happen to them should any harm come to the 20 Portuguese left behind, who surrendered.

== Preparations for the conquest ==
Upon reaching Travancore in April, Sequeira heard that Afonso de Albuquerque had succeeded Dom Francisco de Almeida as Governor of Portuguese India. Fearful of reprisals from Albuquerque for previously supporting Almeida, Sequeira promptly set sail back to Portugal.

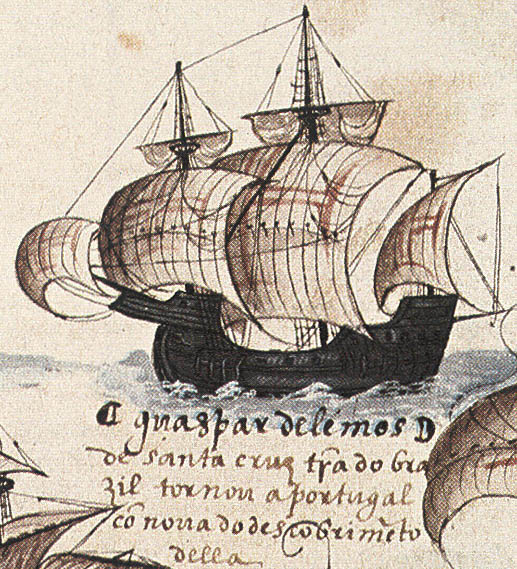
16th-century Portuguese carrack.

At that same time, another smaller fleet under the command of Diogo de Vasconcelos arrived from Lisbon to trade directly with Malacca, dispatched by King Manuel on the assumption that de Sequeira had been successful in establishing commercial ties with the city. Vasconcelos arrived at Angediva Island in August 1510 where he found Albuquerque, resting his troops after failing to capture Goa some months prior, and revealed his intentions of sailing to Malacca immediately. Albuquerque had received messages from the captives at Malacca, written by the factor Rui de Araújo, and sent through envoys of the most powerful merchant of Malacca, a Hindu named Nina Chatu who interceded for the Portuguese. Araújo detailed the Sultan's military force, the strategic importance of Malacca as well as their atrocious captivity. They were kept chained in a dark and narrow prison, often half-starved and alternatively offered bribes and tortured to give up gunnery secrets or embrace Islam in exchange for freedom. Some were forcibly circumcised. Albuquerque persuaded Vasconcelos to postpone his journey to Malacca and had him reluctantly aid him in capturing Goa later that year.

With Goa firmly in Portuguese hands by December, Vasconcelos insisted that he be allowed to proceed to Malacca, which was denied due to the state of war in Malacca. Vasconcelos mutinied and attempted to set sail against the Governor's orders, for which he and his captains were arrested and his pilots hanged or condemned to solitary confinement. Albuquerque assumed direct command of the expedition and in April departed from Cochin along with 1,000 men and 18 ships.

The exact number of the Portuguese troops vary depending on the source. Cartas de Afonso de Albuquerque mentioned 700 Portuguese and 300 Malabarese auxiliaries. Giovanni da Empoli mentioned 1,500 Portuguese and 800 allies, including Chinese and Indian troops. Malay sources mention that the Portuguese had at least 2,000 soldiers. The Portuguese armada carried 400 guns.

=== Crossing of the Indian Ocean ===
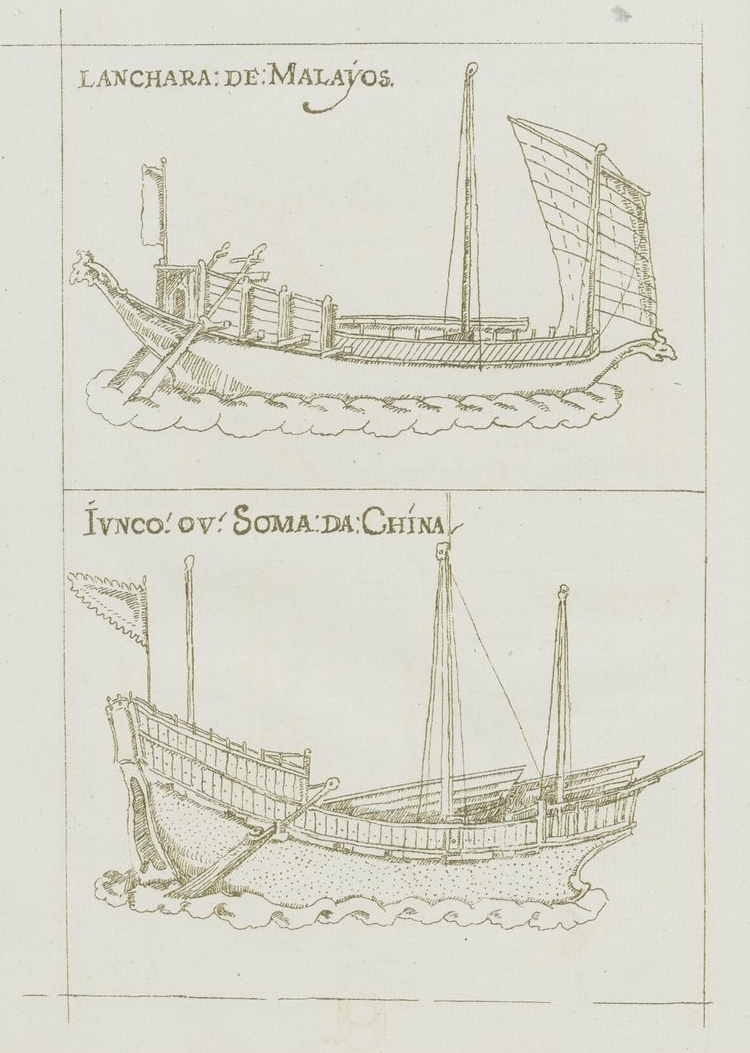
Portuguese depiction of a Malay lancaran and Chinese or Javanese junk.

During the passage to Southeast Asia, the fleet captured five tradeships from the Sultanate of Gujarat, an enemy of the Portuguese, but lost a galley in a storm, though all hands were saved. The fleet anchored in the Kingdom of Pedir in northern Sumatra and rescued nine Portuguese prisoners who had managed to escape there from Malacca; they informed Albuquerque that the city was internally divided, that the Bendahara had recently been assassinated and that the Sultan had mainly been instigated against the Portuguese by Naodabegea, who was at that moment in the neighbouring kingdom of Pasai.

Albuquerque immediately sailed his armada to Pasai and demanded that its sultan surrender Naodabegea. The Sultan immediately dispatched him to Malacca to warn of the approaching Portuguese armada, and sent back a message to Albuquerque claiming that he was nowhere to be found in the kingdom. Nearby however, the Portuguese captured a pangajoa after a stubborn fight and killed its captain, whom they then found to be Naodabegea.

On their way to Malacca, Portuguese came across two junks, one was from Coromandel, which was captured immediately, and the other from Java which weighed about 600 tons. It was a very large junk, larger than their flagship, the Flor do Mar. The Portuguese ordered it to halt but it promptly opened fire on the fleet, after which the Portuguese followed suit. They realized that their bombards were mostly ineffective: Their cannonballs bounced off the hull of the junk. Though after two days of continuous bombardment, the junk had its masts felled, its deck burned, 40 of its 300 crew killed, and both of its rudders destroyed, which compelled it to surrender. Once aboard, the Portuguese found Prince Geinal (or Zeinal), the son of the King of Pasai who was deposed by his relative. Albuquerque hoped he could be made a vassal for trading.

=== Malaccan preparations ===
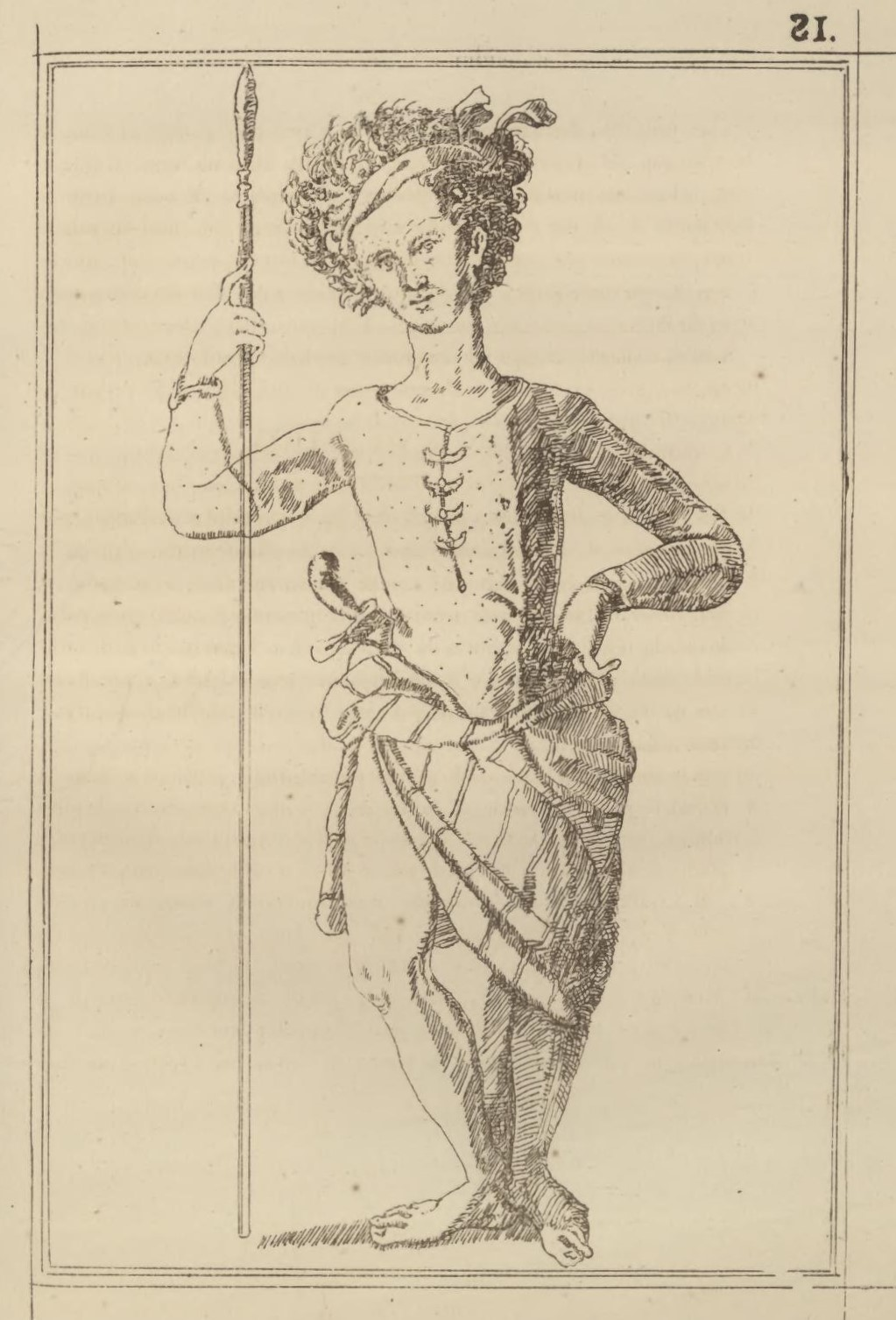
A Malay soldier armed with a spear and a keris.

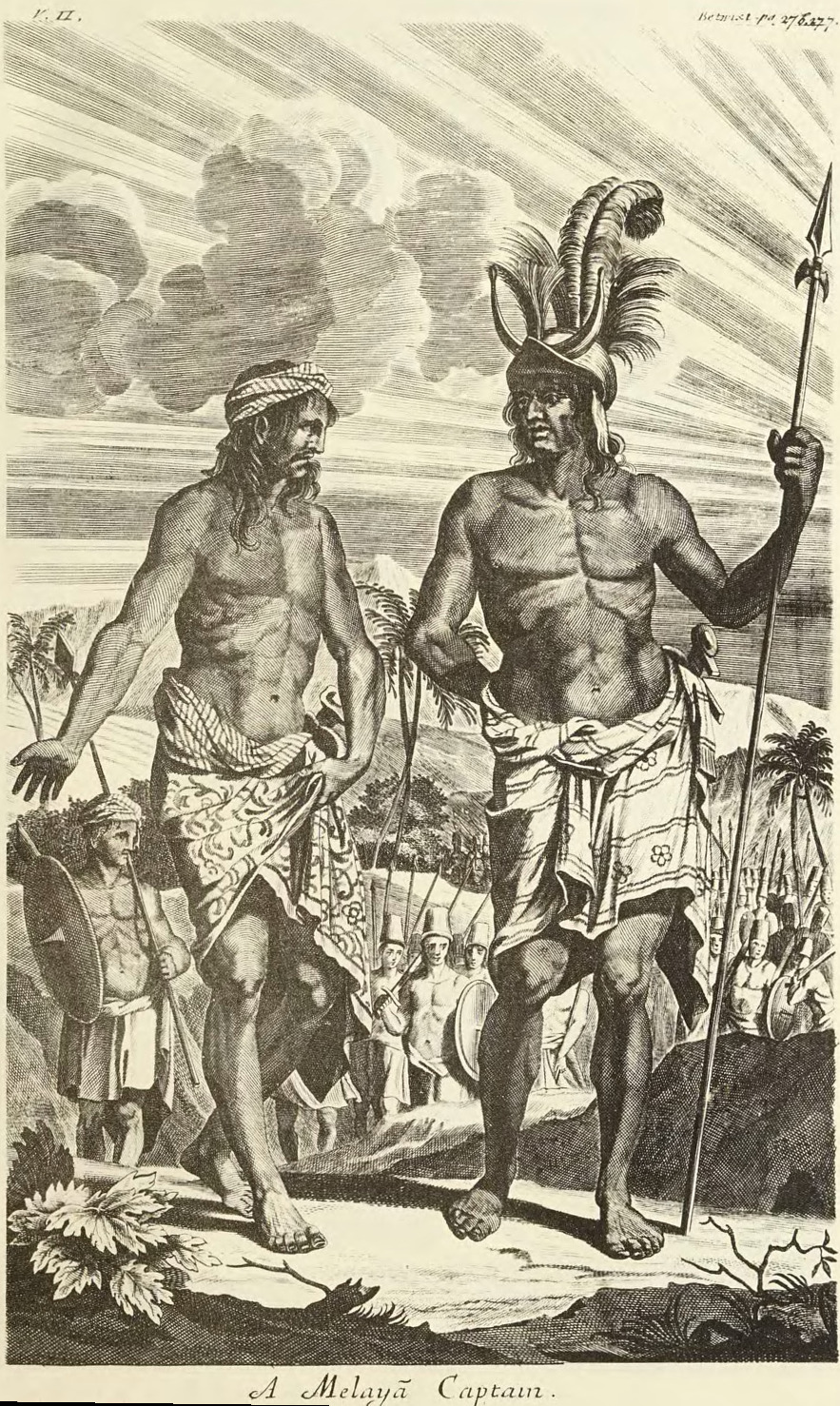
A Malay captain and his soldiers, 1640–1649.

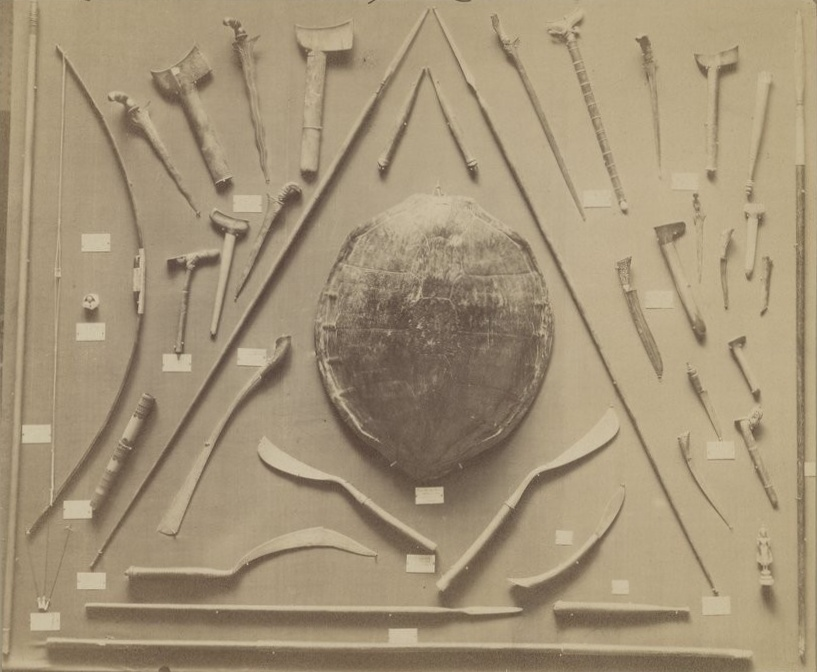
Traditional Malay weapons.

At the time, the Malacca Sultanate covered the entire Malay Peninsula and much of northern Sumatra. Most of the sultan's possessions seemed to have obeyed, to their capacity, his summons for war. Palembang, Indragiri, Menangkabau, and Pahang are all recorded as having sent troops, and possibly other territories did as well; the only renegade state recorded was Kampar, which provided the Portuguese with a local base. The sultan also recruited thousands of mercenaries from Java, who were paid in early August and given three months' wages in advance, and hired 3,000 Turkic and Iranian mercenaries. Finally, he assembled an armory of 8,000 gunpowder weapons, including cannons. The bulk of these were lantaka or cetbang guns firing 1/4 to 1/2 pound shots (they also included many heavy muskets imported from Java). In total the sultan's forces numbered, according to Chinese merchants who leaked information to the Portuguese, 20,000 fighting men. They had been gathered originally to campaign against Malacca's chief enemy in Sumatra, the Aru Kingdom.

Despite having a lot of artillery and firearms, the weapons were mostly purchased from the Javanese and Gujarati, where the Javanese and Gujarati were the operators of the weapons. In the early 16th century, before the Portuguese arrival, the Malays lacked firearms. The Malay Annals, mentioned that in 1509 they did not understand “why bullets killed”, indicating their unfamiliarity with using firearms in battle, if not in ceremony. As recorded in the Malay Annals:

After (the Portuguese) coming to Malacca, then met (each other), they shot (the city) with cannon. So all the people of Malacca were surprised, shocked to hear the sound of the cannon. They said, "What is this sound, like thunder?". Then the cannon came about the people of Malacca, some lost their necks, some lost their arms, some lost their thighs. The people of Malacca were even more astonished to see the effect of the gun. They said: "What is this weapon called that is round, yet is sharp enough to kill?" (Note: In Malay: Setelah datang ke Melaka, maka bertemu, ditembaknya dengan meriam. Maka segala orang Melaka pun hairan, terkejut mendengar bunyi meriam itu. Katanya, "Bunyi apa ini, seperti guruh ini?". Maka meriam itu pun datanglah mengenai orang Melaka, ada yang putus lehernya, ada yang putus tangannya, ada yang panggal pahanya. Maka bertambahlah hairannya orang Melaka melihat fi'il bedil itu. Katanya: "Apa namanya senjata yang bulat itu maka dengan tajamnya maka ia membunuh?".)

Lendas da India by Gaspar Correia and Asia Portuguesa by Manuel de Faria y Sousa confirmed the Malay Annals' account. Both recorded a similar story, although not as spectacular as described in Malay Annals. Rui de Araújo noted that Malacca lacked gunpowder and gunners. The captured Portuguese were pressured to make gunpowder for the Malays, but none of the captives knew how to make it.

Wan Mohd Dasuki Wan Hasbullah explained several facts about the existence of gunpowder weapons in Malacca and other Malay states before the arrival of the Portuguese:

1. No evidence showed that guns, cannons, and gunpowder are made in Malay states.
2. No evidence showed that guns were ever used by the Malacca Sultanate before the Portuguese attack, even from Malay sources.
3. Based on the majority of cannons reported by the Portuguese, the Malays preferred small artillery.

The inhabitants of the Malay Peninsula did not use big ships. In naval warfare, the Malays used lancaran and banting, propelled by breast oars and 2 masts, with 2 rudders (one on both sides of the hull). The Malays are not accustomed to navigating the ocean, they only made coasting voyages along the shores of the Malay Peninsula. Large shipbuilding industry did not exist in Malacca; they only produce small vessels, not large vessels. Malay records from centuries later mention the use of a class of ship called ghali, but this is an anachronism: The ghali ship appeared in the archipelago after the introduction of the Mediterranean galley by the Portuguese. The first ghali used by the regional fleet only appeared in the late 1530s, and not until the 1560s that the ghali became more widespread, mostly used by Acehnese people, not Malays. According to Albuquerque, the Malays of Malacca used an unspecified number of lancaran and twenty penjajap against the Portuguese. Rui de Araújo reported that the Malaccan Sultan had 150 perahu.

The real number of Malaccan fighting men was not more than 4,000, the rest were slaves pressed into service. The weapons of the fighting men were lances. Bows and blowpipes were also used and were made locally. Swords were found but they were brought by the Gores (Ryukyuan people). Very few wore armor, even oval shields were rare and were commonly only used by officials. The weapons of the slaves were knives and daggers. The majority of the artillery was small caliber. Their cannons were inferior in range compared to the Portuguese cannons, and less than 100 were effectively deployed during the fighting. As with most of Southeast Asia, they did not have a professional army. What is called an army is actually common people gathered in times of war, especially those with such legal duties.

Modern depictions of Malacca Sultanate

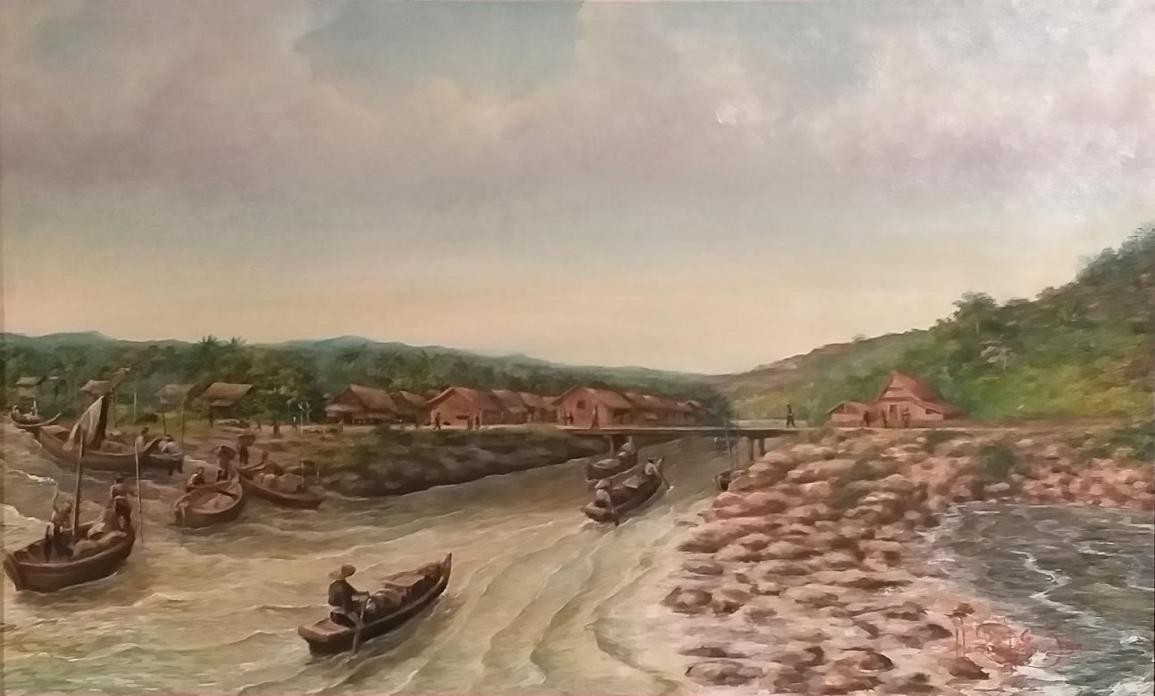
Reconstruction of the port of Malacca after its foundation, from Malacca Maritime Museum

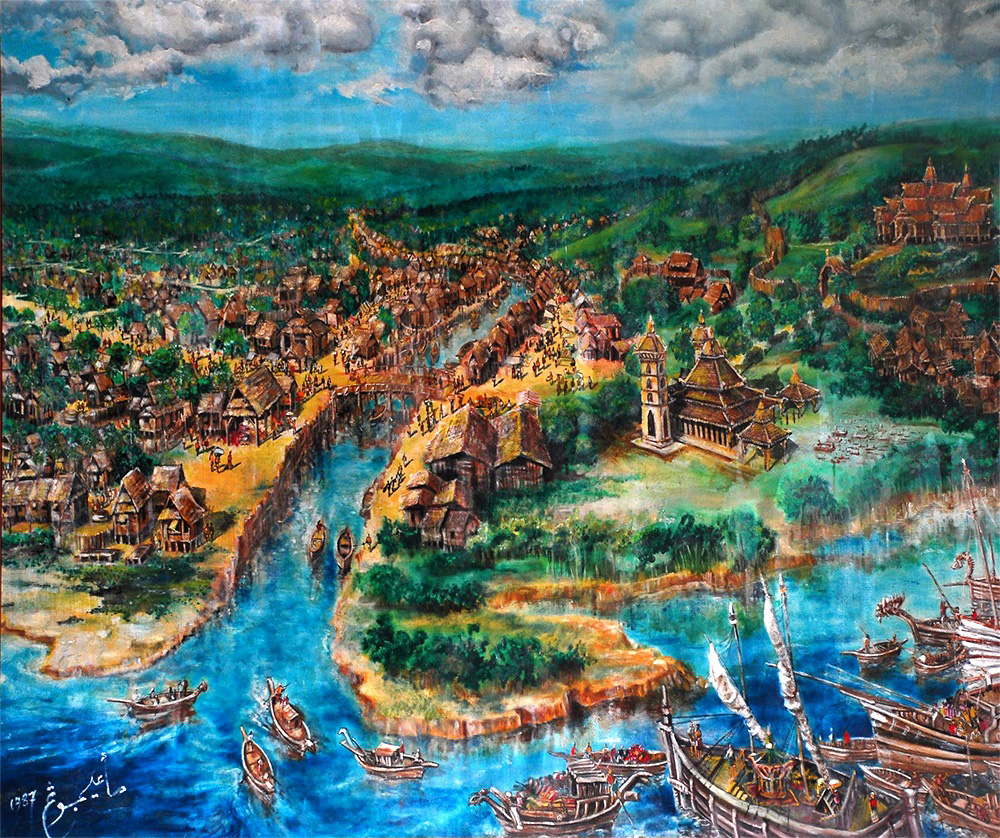
Malacca Sultanate during the reign of Sultan Alauddin Riayat Shah (1477–1488) by Maembong Ayoh

Malacca was a typical Malay riverine city: It had no permanent fortifications nor a wall, they, however, had wooden or bamboo stockades which were erected for temporary defense for placing small and large cannons. Only the royal compound was usually fortified, the city itself was not. Almost all buildings were built using organic materials such as wood, matting, and split bamboo, raised above the ground on poles 1–4 m high. The palace of Malacca was also built in this style, with as many as 90 wooden pillars supporting it. The only structures with solid materials (stone or brick) were the foundation and the walls of the Malaccan mosque, and the tombs of the rulers and saints. A foreign observer explained the Malay perception of a city:

... they also have this opinion themselves, saying that their city not being surrounded with walls, like the Lacedaemonians their bodies would serve as wall and rampart.

— Pierre du Jarric, Histoire des choses plus memorable advenues tant ez Indes Orientales, que autres pais de la descouverte des Portugais, Volume I: p. 630

Reflecting decades later on how poorly the Malays had fared against the Portuguese in Malacca and elsewhere, cartographer Manuel Godinho de Erédia noted many of the weaknesses of their ground troops. Among them were a lack of ordered military tactics and formations, the relative lightness of their artillery, lack of armor, reliance on bows and blowpipes, and ineffective fortifications.

The armed forces of the Malayos do not follow the ordered military tactics of Europe: they only make use of attacks and sallies in mass formation: their sole plan is to construct an ambush in the narrow paths and woods and thickets, and then make an attack with a body of armed men: whenever they draw themselves up for battle, they acquit themselves badly and usually suffer heavy losses... The arms which they ordinarily use in warfare are the sword, shield, lance, bows and arrows, and blow-pipes with poisoned darts. At the present day, in consequence of intercourse with us, they use muskets and ordnance. The sword, a blade measuring 5 palmo (110 cm) in length, is called padan (pedang) among them: like the Turkish sword, it has a single edge. The dagger, called cris, is a blade measuring 2 palmo (44 cm) in length, and is made of fine steel; it bears a deadly poison; the sheath is of wood, the hilt is of animals' horn or of rare stone... Their bows are larger than the bows of Persia. The lance called azagaya is 10 palmo (2.2 m) in length: these lances are much used as missiles. There are other lances, as much as 25 palmo (5.5 m) long: besides a great number of soligues (seligi) made of nyboes and used as missiles... Their artillery, as a rule, is not heavy; formerly they used mortars and swivel-guns made of various metals (Note: The original Portuguese version mentioned berços and pedreyros, berços refer to breech-loading swivel guns, while pedreyros refer to medieval cannon or mortar firing piedra (stone). See De Erédia 1881, p. 21.)... Regarding the employment of artillery amongst the Malayos, we know that on the conquest of Malacca in the year 1511, Afonso de Albuquerque captured much small artillery, esmerils, falconets, and medium-sized sakers... The fortresses and fortifications of the Malayos were usually structures composed of earth and placed between plank uprights. We do find some buildings made of shaped stones joined together without mortar or pitch... In this simple style were built the principal fortresses and royal palaces... Usually, however, the natives use fortifications and enclosures and palisades made of big timber, of which there is a large quantity along the River Panagim on the same coast... In addition to their fortifications, they dig deep pits in front of wooden fences; these pits contain traps and pointed sticks treated with poison; they also make use of holes covered with branches, and of traps set in ambush, with which they inflict much damage... So in olden times their fortresses, besides being made merely of earth, were built in a simple form, without the proper military points.

— Declaraçam de Malaca e India Meridional com o Cathay by Manuel Godinho de Erédia, 1613.

As the Malaccans had only been introduced to firearms after 1509, they had not adopted the practice of European and Indian cities of fortifying their port. As such, they relied upon the Gujaratis to help them build up such defenses. The Gujaratis handled all the work of building up the fortifications of Malacca. A Gujarati captain who wanted to wage war with the Portuguese provided Malacca with Gujarati ships and promised the help of 600 fighting men and 20 bombards. Other foreign defenders of Malacca were Iranians, who were important traders in the Indian Ocean.

== Portuguese conquest ==
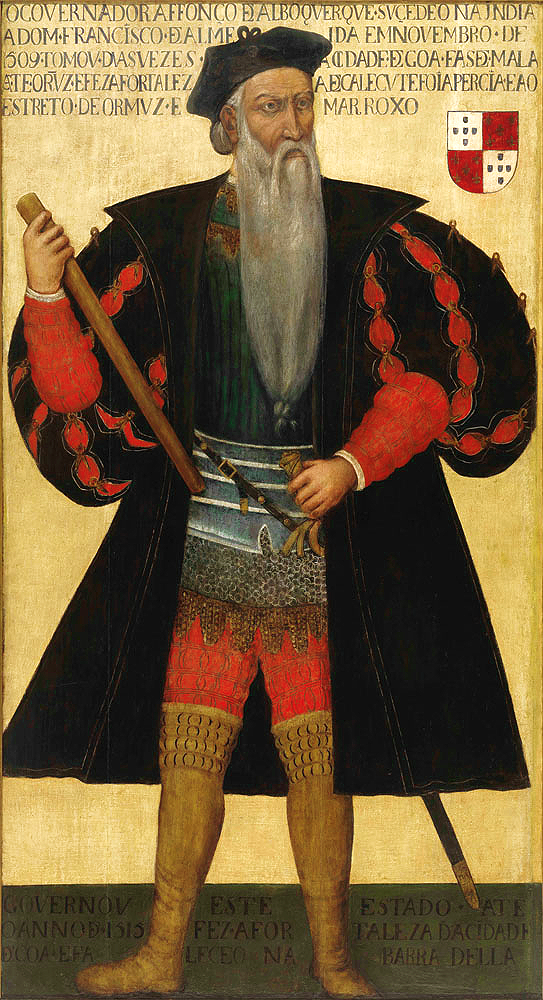
Afonso de Albuquerque, 2nd Governor of Portuguese India

The Portuguese armada arrived at Malacca by 1 July, with the Flor do Mar in the lead. The arrival of the armada to the harbour was designed to be impactful, accompanied by the displaying of flags, trumpeting, and a half hour salvo. They displayed battle arrangements and caused great commotion in the harbour but Albuquerque declared that no ship was to set sail without his permission. He then sought to negotiate the safe return of the remaining prisoners. As Albuquerque considered the Sultan's conduct to have been treasonous, he demanded that the prisoners be returned without a ransom as a show of good-faith. Mahmud Shah replied with vague and evasive answers, expressing his desire for peace, declaring himself a servant of King Manuel, and insisted that Albuquerque sign a peace treaty beforehand. The Sultan was trying to buy time as he continued to fortify the city and call back the fleet, whose admiral the Portuguese identified as "Lassemane", or laksamana. Believing his ruler to be doomed, the admiral appears to have deserted with his forces to the island of Singapore.

Albuquerque continued to receive messages from the prisoner Rui de Araújo, who informed Albuquerque of the Sultan's military strength, through Nina Chatu. The Sultan could muster 20,000 men, which included Turkish and Persian bowmen, thousands of artillery pieces, and 20 war elephants, but he noted that the artillery was crude and lacked enough gunners. Albuquerque himself would later report to the King that only 4,000 of those men were battle-ready.

The sultan on his part was not too intimidated by the comparatively small Portuguese contingent. Albuquerque would later write to King Manuel that the sultan had somehow managed to correctly estimate the total number of soldiers aboard his fleet with a margin of error of less than three men. Thus, he remained in the city organizing its defence. The King of Pahang had come to Malacca to marry the Sultan's daughter and he would help with his forces. The Gujarati community funded 600 Turkish mercenaries.

During the negotiations, Albuquerque was visited by representatives of several merchant communities, such as the Hindus, who expressed their support for the Portuguese. Five Chinese captains in the harbour who were indignant at the Sultan's conduct towards them warned Albuquerque of what he was up against and offered to help in any way that they could. Albuquerque requested no more than several barges to help land troops, and invited them over to a galley to watch the fighting safely from afar. He said he did not wish the Chinese to suffer reprisals should the attack fail and authorized any who wished to leave to set sail from Malacca, which left the Chinese with a very good impression of the Portuguese.

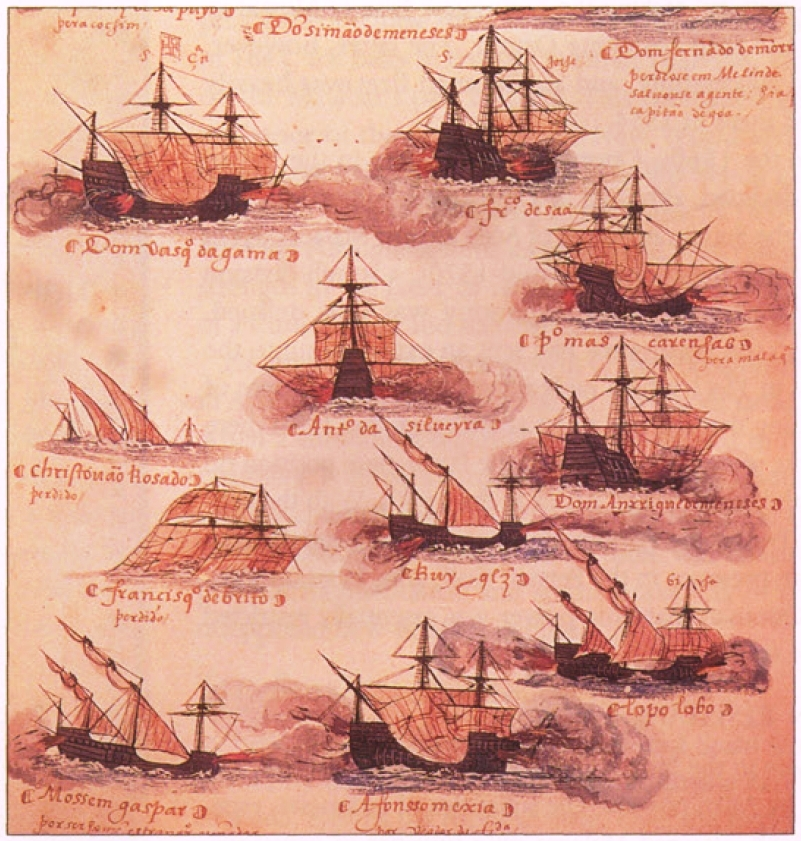
Portuguese carracks and caravels. The Portuguese fleet provided fire support to the landing troops with its powerful artillery.

Following weeks of stalled negotiations, by the middle of July the fleet bombarded the city, while a detachment of Portuguese torched the houses along the sea-front and the Gujarati tradeships anchored in the harbour. The Sultan promptly released the prisoners and they embraced their comrades on the beach. Albuquerque took the chance to further demand a heavy compensation: 300,000 cruzados and authorization to build a fortress wherever he wished. The Sultan refused to accept this. He notified Albuquerque that he accepted his demands, but continued to reinforce the defenses of Malacca in full view of the Portuguese.

Presumably Albuquerque had anticipated the Sultan's response as he then gathered his captains and revealed that an assault would take place the following morning, 25 July, Day of Santiago. None slept that night.

=== First assault ===
Albuquerque divided his forces in two groups, a smaller group under the command of Dom João de Lima and a larger group which he commanded personally. The landing began at 2 am. While the Portuguese fleet bombarded enemy positions on shore, the infantry rowed their boats onto the beaches on either side of the city's bridge. They immediately came under artillery fire from the Malaccan stockades, though this was largely ineffective.

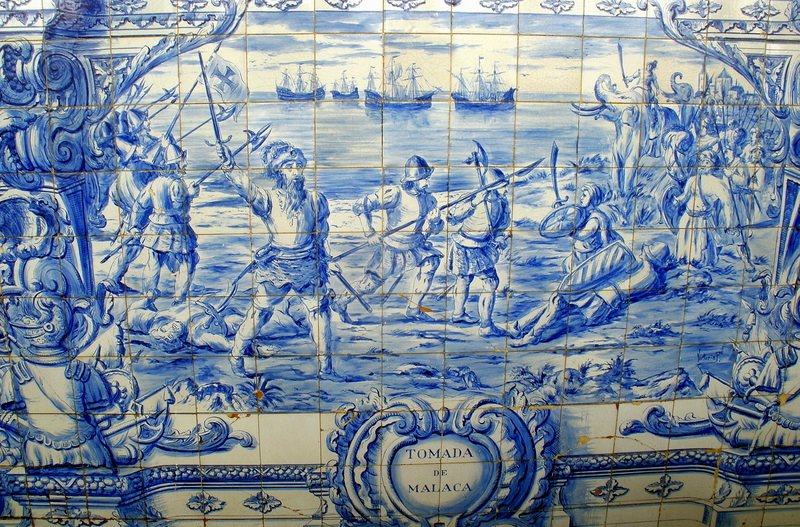
"The Taking of Malacca" depicted in an azulejo tile panel at the Military Museum of Lisbon, made in 1925.

Albuquerque landed his forces west of the bridge, known as Upeh, whilst de Lima landed on the east side, Hilir, where the sultan's palace and a mosque were located. Once ashore, the Portuguese threw the barges' protective pavises on the sand to walk over the caltrops and gunpowder mines scattered around.

Protected by steel helmets and breastplates, and with the fidalgos clad in full plate armour in the lead, the Portuguese charged the Malaccan defensive positions, shattering any resistance almost immediately. With the stockades overcome, Albuquerque's squadron pushed the defenders back to the main street and proceeded towards the bridge, where they faced stiff resistance and an attack from the rear.

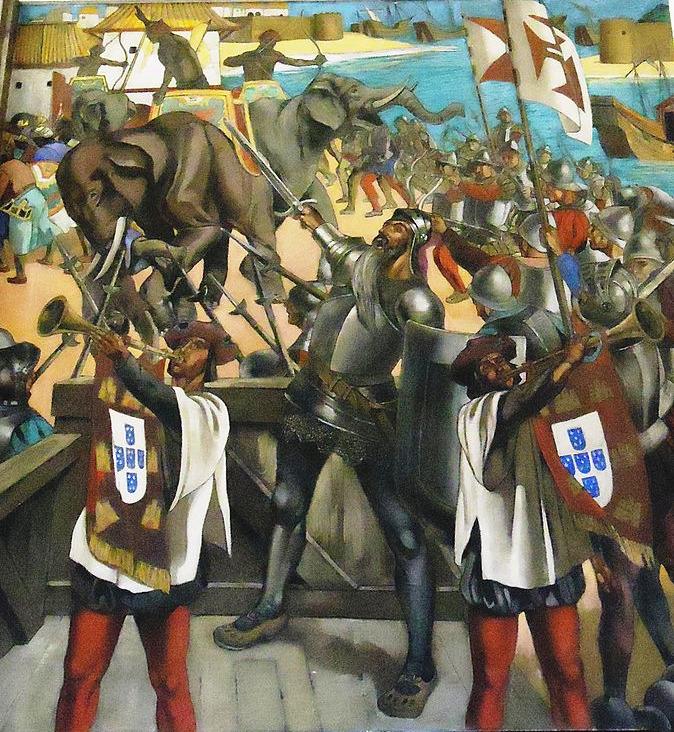
Commemorative fresco depicting the taking of Malacca by Afonso de Albuquerque, displayed at the Portuguese parliament.

On the east side, the squadron of de Lima faced a counter-attack by the royal corps of war elephants, commanded by the sultan, his son Alauddin, and his son-in-law, the Sultan of Pahang. Briefly shaken, the Portuguese fidalgos raised their pikes and attacked the royal elephant, causing it to turn away in panic, scattering the other elephants and throwing the troops that followed into disarray. The sultan fell from his elephant and was wounded, but managed to escape amidst the confusion. By the middle of the day the two Portuguese groups had met at the bridge, surrounding the last defenders who jumped to the river where they were intercepted by Portuguese landing barge crews. With the bridge secure, the Portuguese raised canvas sheets to protect the exhausted infantry from the intense sun. The assault was called off when Albuquerque realized how short on provisions they were, and ordered the troops to embark again, setting the royal palace and the mosque on fire along the way.

To prevent the Malaccans from retaking positions on the bridge, the following day the Portuguese seized a junk, armed it with artillery, including fast-firing breech-loading guns and very long pikes to prevent it from being rammed by incendiary rafts, and towed it towards the bridge. At the rivermouth, it ran aground and came under heavy fire; its captain, António de Abreu, was shot in the face but remained at his post, declaring he would command the ship from his sickbed if necessary.

=== Second assault ===
On 8 August, Albuquerque held a meeting with his captains in which he stressed the need to secure the city to sever the flow of spices towards Cairo and Mecca through Calicut and to prevent Islam from taking hold. For this assault, Albuquerque landed his entire force, divided into three groups, on the western side of Malacca – Upeh – supported by a small caravel, a galley, and landing barges armed as gunboats. As the junk was dislodged by the rising morning tide, drawing the defenders' fire as it sailed towards the bridge, the landing began, while the armada bombarded the city. Once ashore the Portuguese quickly overcame the Malaccan defenses and recaptured the bridge, by then devoid of defenders. On either side the Portuguese set up barricades with barrels of dirt, where they placed artillery. From the east side a squadron assaulted the mosque, which shattered the defenders after a drawn-out struggle.

16th-century Portuguese naval banner bearing the cross of the Order of Christ.

With the bridge fortified and secured with enough provisions, Albuquerque ordered a few squadrons and several fidalgos to run through the streets and neutralize Malaccan guns on rooftops, cutting down any who resisted them, with the loss of many civilians. The Portuguese remained on the bridge while the armada bombarded the city throughout that night and for the next ten days, at the end of which the inhabitants had become desperate, and began pleading with Albuquerque for peace. The Peguans were the first, and Albuquerque offered them Portuguese flags to mark their households so they would not be attacked, and authorization to sail to their country if they wished.

On 24 August, as the sultan's resistance waned, Albuquerque decided to take full control of the city, commanding 400 men in ranks of 6 men wide through the streets, at the sound of drums and trumpets, eliminating any remaining pockets of resistance. According to Correia, the Malaccans were frightened by the Portuguese heavy pikes "which they had never seen before". The cleanup operation took 8 days.

Unable to oppose the Portuguese any further, the sultan gathered his royal treasure and what remained of his forces and retreated into the jungle.

=== Sack ===
With the city secured, Albuquerque ordered for Malacca to be sacked in an orderly manner. For three days, from morning to nightfall, groups were given a limited time to run in turns to the city and return to the beach with whatever they could carry back. They were strictly forbidden from sacking the property of Chinese, Hindus, and Peguans, who had supported the Portuguese and were given flags to mark their households. The general population of Malacca was unharmed. The plunder was immense: Over 200,000 cruzados reverted to the Crown along with 3,000 bronze and iron bombards and several slaves.

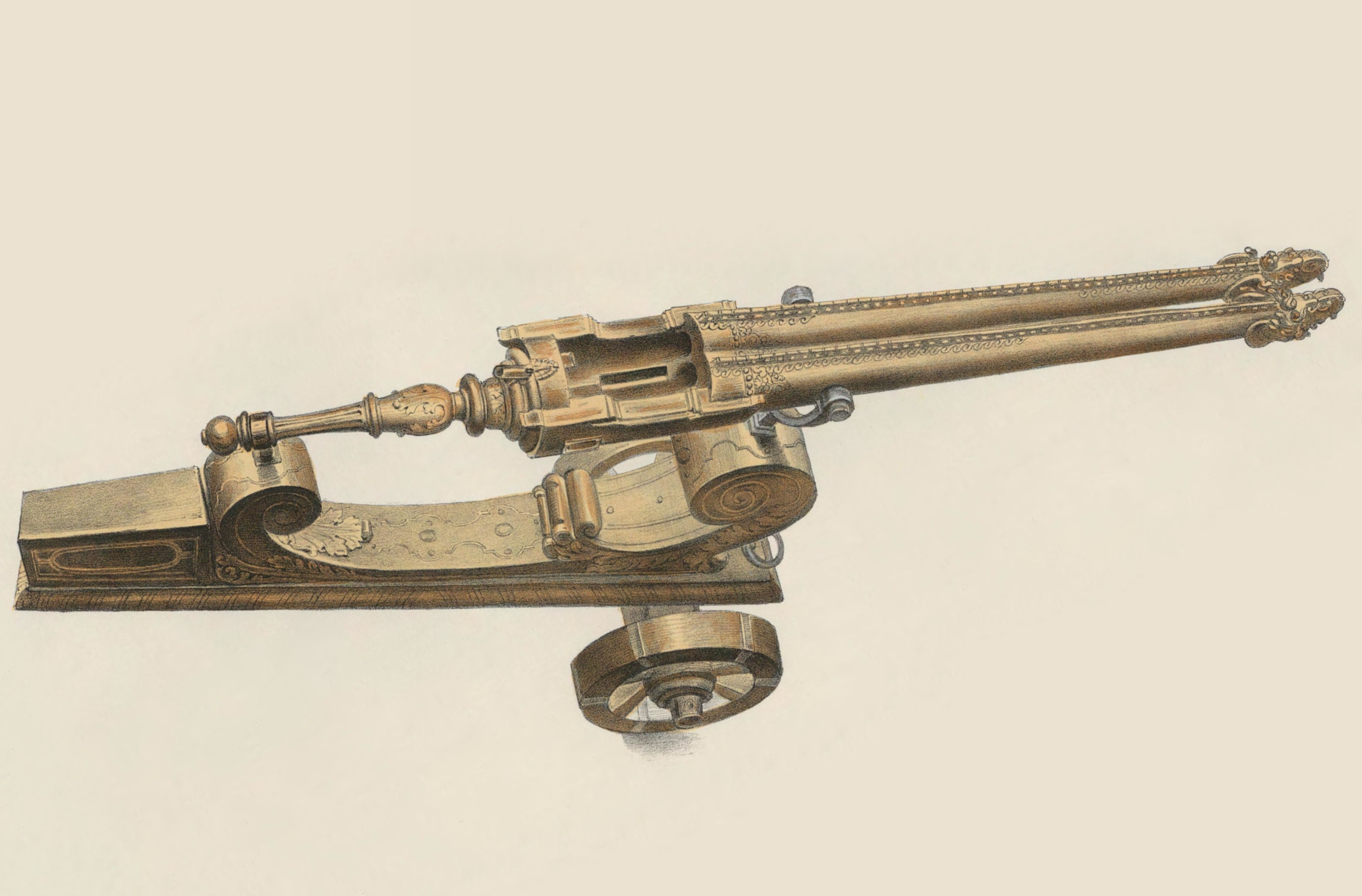
A cannon from East Indies (precisely Java), ca. 1522.

The cannons found were of various types: esmeril (1/4 to 1/2-pounder swivel gun, probably a cetbang or lantaka), falconet (cast bronze swivel gun larger than the esmeril, 1 to 2-pounder, probably a lela), and medium saker (long cannon or culverin between a six and a ten pounder, probably a meriam), and bombard (short, fat, and heavy cannon). The Malaccans also had 1 large cannon sent by the king of Calicut. Albuquerque compared the Malaccan gunfounders favourably with those of Germany, who at the time were the acknowledged leaders in the manufacture of firearms, and the Malaccan gun carriages were described as unrivaled by any other land, including Portugal. However, he did not state what ethnicity the Malaccan gunfounder was. Duarte Barbosa stated that the arquebus-maker of Malacca was Javanese. Manuel Godinho de Erédia suggested that Malaccan artillery came from Pegu and Siam, where they had an establishment for casting smaller, first-order artillery, as well as a foundry for all other kinds of metalwork. The Javanese also manufactured their cannon in Malacca. The Javanese handled much of the productive work in Malacca before 1511 and in 17th-century Pattani. The Portuguese also captured 3,000 of the 5,000 muskets which had been furnished from Java.

According to Correia, regular soldiers received over 4,000 cruzados each, captains received up to 30,000; At the time, 1,000 cruzados was roughly the equivalent of the annual income of a count in Portugal. Albuquerque recovered a stool encrusted with jewels, four golden lions and a golden bracelet which was said to have the magical property of preventing the wearer from bleeding. He estimated that two-thirds of the wealth of the city remained, but he did not wish to ruin the inhabitants.

== Aftermath ==
28 Portuguese were killed during the operation with many more wounded, some by poisoned arrows, few of whom survived. Despite Mahmud Shah's impressive number of artillery pieces and firearms, they were largely ineffective.

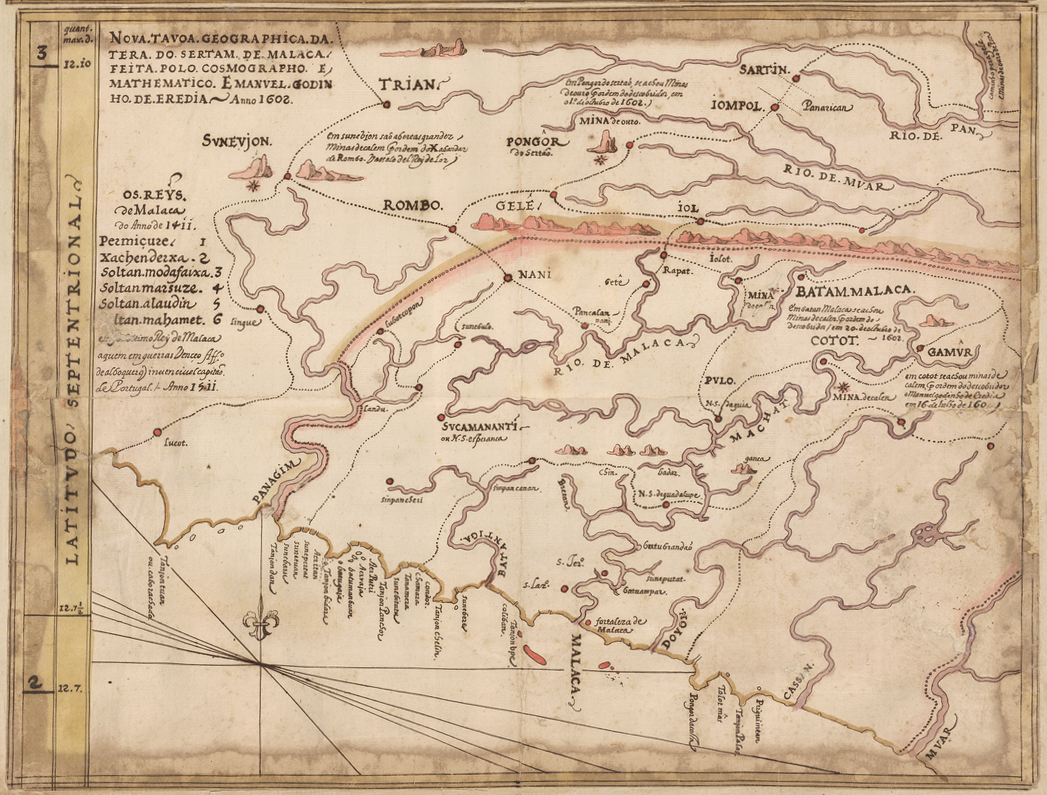
Portuguese map of the region of Malacca.

After the battle the sultan retreated a few kilometers south of Malacca, to the mouth of the Muar River where he met up with the armada and set up camp, waiting for the Portuguese to abandon the city once they were done sacking it. From Muar, Mahmuds 80 year old admiral, or laksamana requested authorization from Afonso de Albuquerque to return to Malacca and offered to serve the king of Portugal:

This Lassamane was a man of eighty years of age, a good soldier, of good repute and great knowledge: when he perceived that the king of Malaca was lost, he went and settled in Singapura, and after Afonso Dalbuquerque was in possession of Malaca, he came down to the river of Muar and sent to ask a safeguard, declaring that he was desirous of returning to live at Malaca and serving the king of Portugal. Afonso Dalbuquerque sent him the safeguard; nevertheless he would not come, and it was thought that some of the Moors of Malaca, hoping to gain favours from Afonso Dalboquerque and obtain the government of the land had written something to this Lassamane, whereby they had prevented his coming, for they feared that as he was a man of uncommon capabilities, Afonso Dalboquerque would seize the opportunity to make use of him for the governing of Malaca.

Scholars have noted that this matches the profile of Hang Tuah.

=== The fortress ===
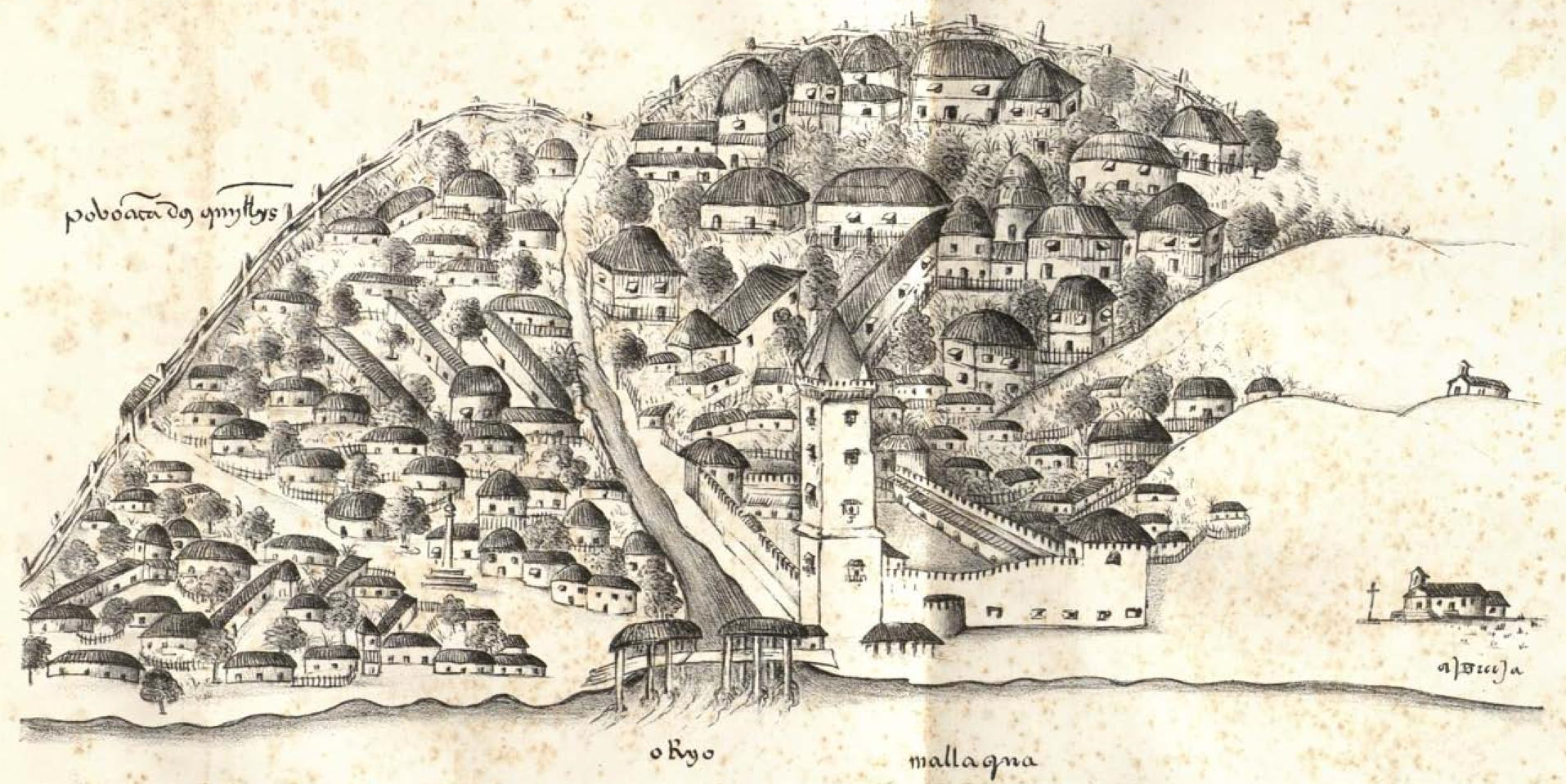
Portuguese drawing of Malacca c. 1550–1563.

Contrary to Sultan Mahmud Shah's aspirations, Albuquerque did not intend to just sack the city, but to hold it permanently. He ordered the construction of a fortress close to the shoreline, which became known as A Famosa, due to its unusually tall keep, over 18 meters (59 ft) high. Stone was brought in by ships as there wasn't enough in the city for its completion. It had a garrison of 500 men, 200 of which were dedicated serve aboard the 10 ships left behind as the fortress' service fleet. After the conquest, the Portuguese found a sepulcher (rock-cut tomb) below the ground and used stone from it to build the fortress. Additional stones were sourced from the walls and foundation of the city's mosque.

Albuquerque suggested that the names of all who played a leading part in the action should be engraved in a memorial stone over the gate, but the selection of the names turned out to be a source of bitter argument. In the end, Albuquerque had the stone set back to front and inscribed with the words Lapidem quem reprobaverunt edificantes or "the stone which the builders rejected".

=== Administration and diplomacy ===
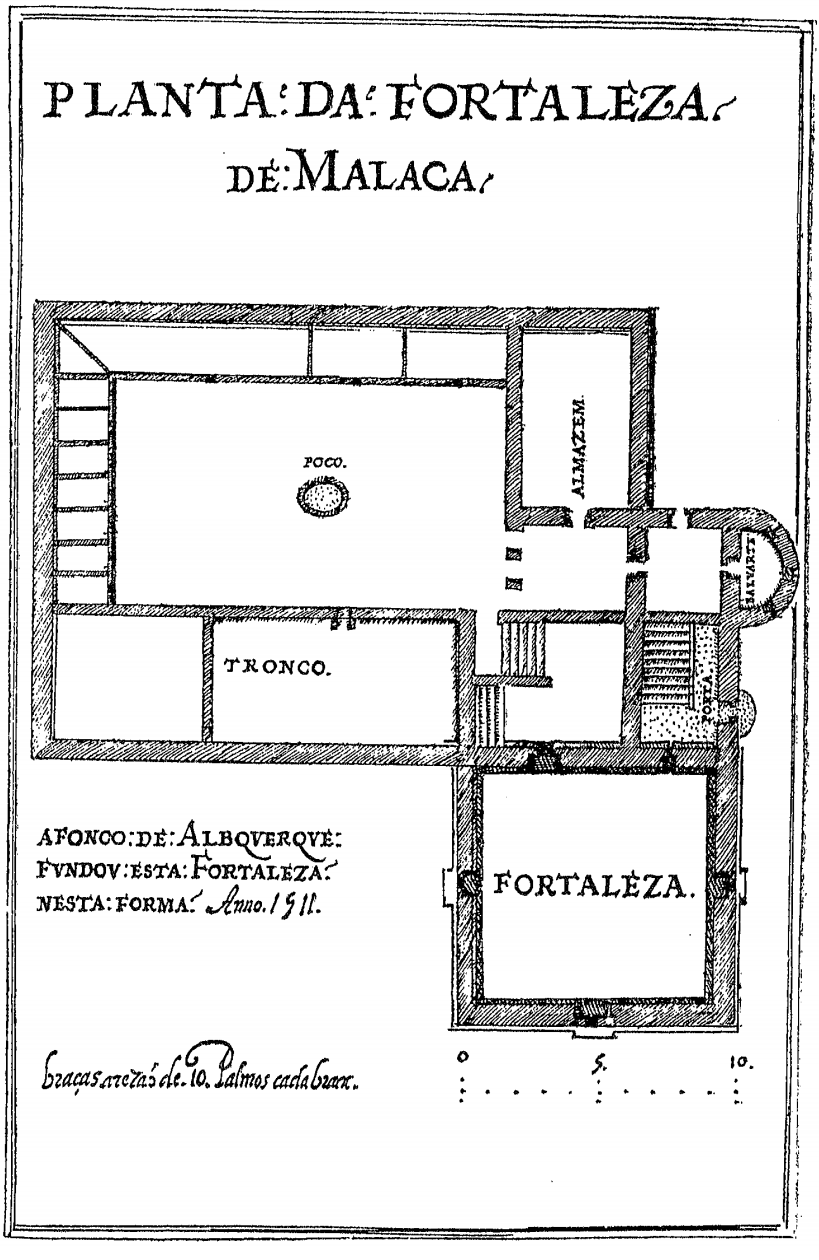
Floorplan of the original fortress built in 1511

As hostilities ceased, Albuquerque realized that the maintenance of such a distant city would rely on the support they could gather from the local population and neighbouring polities. He assured the inhabitants that they would be able to proceed with their affairs as normal and declared religious freedom. Nina Chatu was nominated as the new Bendahara of Malacca and representative of the Hindu community. The Javanese, Luzonian, and Malay communities also got their own magistrates. The Javanese representative, Utimuta Raja, was executed and replaced shortly after for conspiring with the exiled sultan. Utimuta Raja's trial was the first act of justice the Portuguese carried out in Malacca, with which "the people of Malacca was much relieved from that tyrant, and considered us folk of much justice"

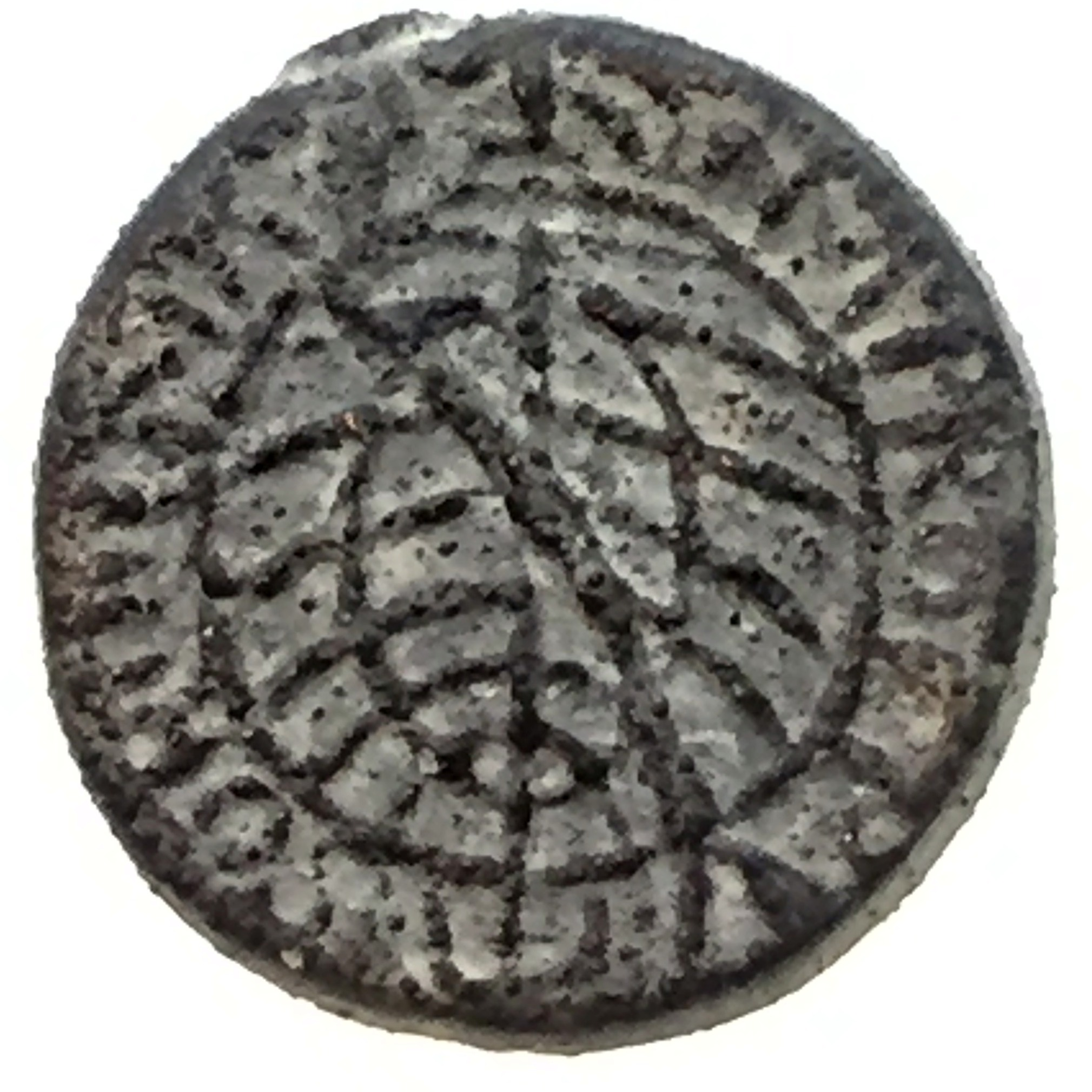
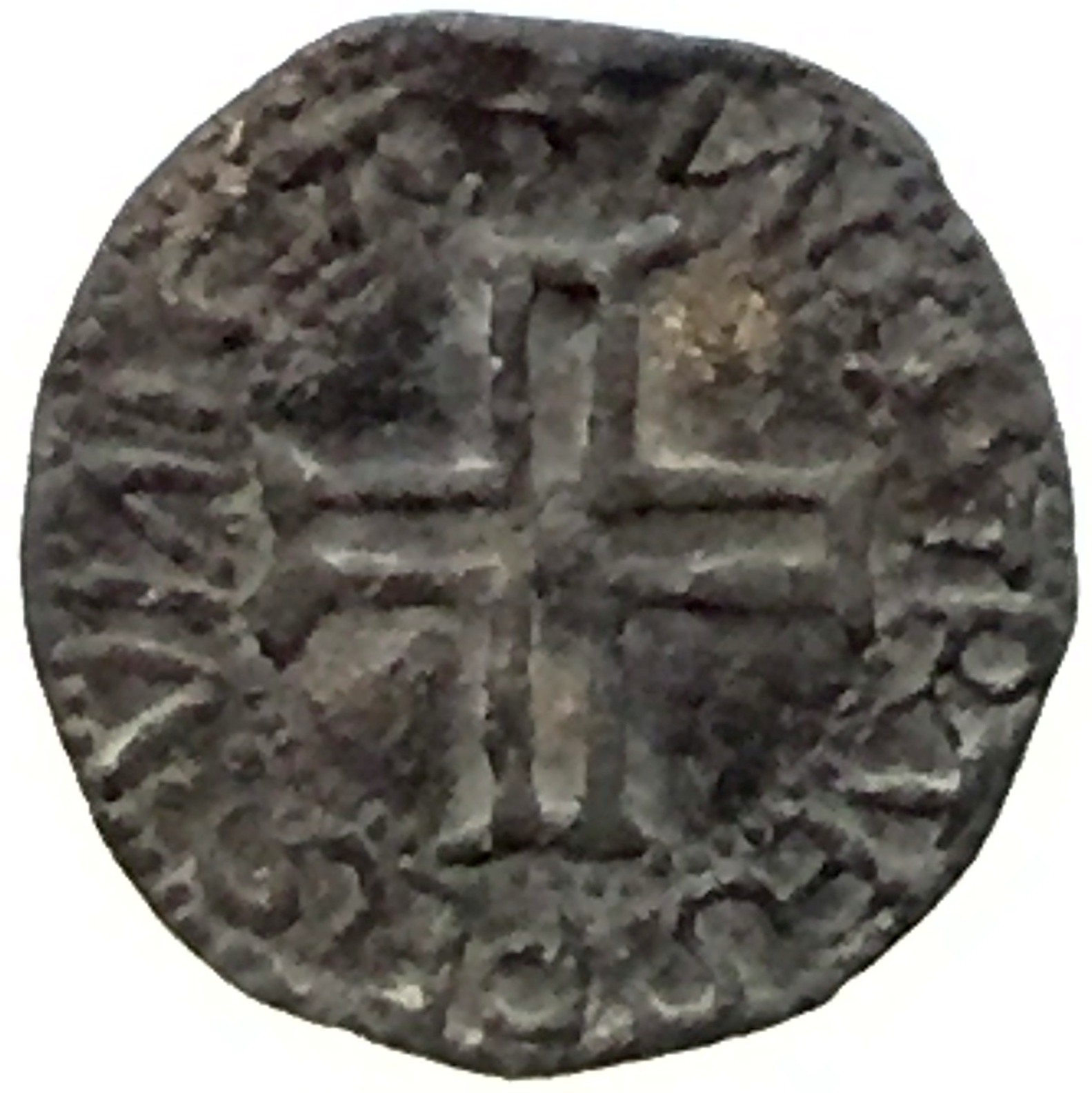
Portuguese bastardo (left) and soldo (right) from Malacca, reign of King Manuel I (1495–1521).

New currency was minted and a parade through the city streets was organized, in which the new coins were thrown from silver bowls to the populace from atop elephants. Two heralds proclaimed the new laws, one in Portuguese and another in Malay, followed by the Portuguese troops marching behind, playing trumpets and drums, "to great astonishment of the locals", as Correia puts it.

Diplomatic missions were dispatched to Pegu and Ayutthaya to secure allies and new suppliers of vital foodstuffs such as rice, to replace the Javanese who were hostile to the Portuguese. Albuquerque had already sent an envoy, Duarte Fernandes, to Ayutthaya in July, while the assault on the city was still ongoing, and an exchange of diplomats secured the firm support of the King of Ayutthaya, who despised Mahmud Shah. The Kingdom of Pegu also confirmed its support for the Portuguese and in 1513 junks arrived from the Pegu to trade in Malacca. The king of Campar had married Sultan Mahmud's daughter, but he rebuffed his father-in-law and allied with Albuquerque instead. The king of Java also allied with Albuquerque and desired to offer him men and supplies, and all other things that might be necessary for the future war in Malacca.

While he remained in the city, Albuquerque received envoys and ambassadors from many kingdoms of Maritime Southeast Asia, bearing gifts to the King of Portugal. He gathered everything he could regarding the history, geography and ethnology of the region and took note of every piece of information he could collect, which was probably facilitated by the great number of ambassadors that kept arriving from the various of rulers and kinglets of the archipelago to pay homage.

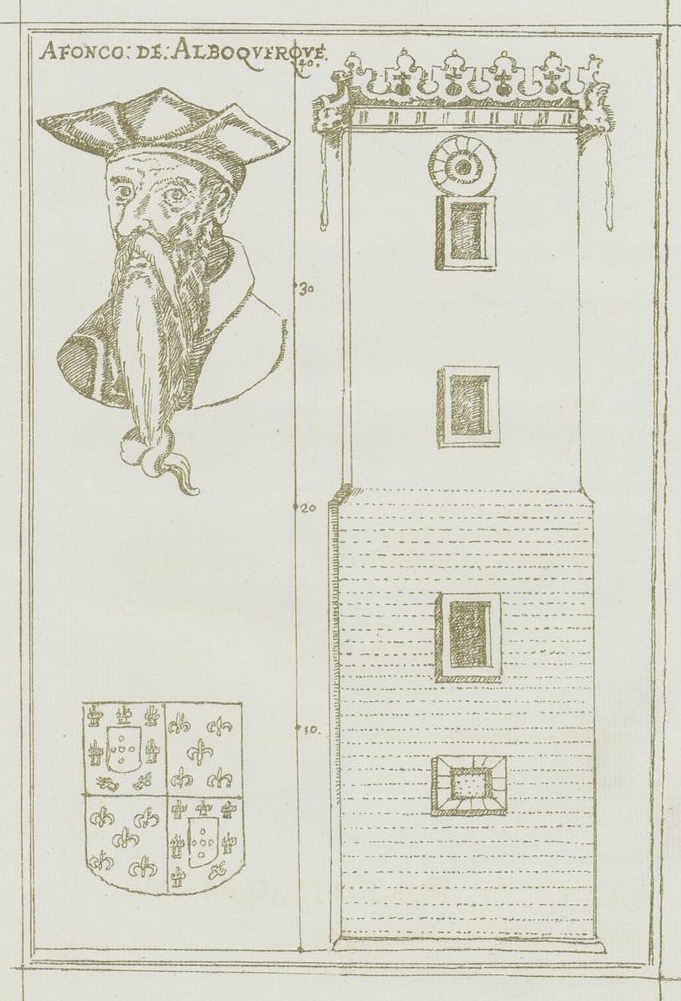
"A Famosa" proper, the name of the fortress' unusually tall keep. It bore a sculpted bust of Albuquerque on the façade.

The Portuguese recovered a large chart from a Javanese maritime pilot, which according to Albuquerque displayed:

...the Cape of Good Hope, Portugal and the land of Brazil, the Red Sea and the Sea of Persia, the Clove Islands, the navigation of the Chinese and the Gores, with their rhumbs and direct routes followed by the ships, and the hinterland, and how the kingdoms border on each other. It seems to me. Sir, that this was the best thing I have ever seen, and Your Highness will be very pleased to see it; it had the names in Javanese writing, but I had with me a Javanese who could read and write. I send this piece to Your Highness, which Francisco Rodrigues traced from the other, in which Your Highness can truly see where the Chinese and Gores come from, and the course your ships must take to the Clove Islands, and where the gold mines lie, and the islands of Java and Banda, of nutmeg and mace, and the land of the King of Siam, and also the end of the land of the navigation of the Chinese, the direction it takes, and how they do not navigate farther.

— Letter of Albuquerque to King Manuel I of Portugal, 1 April 1512.

Some of the information suggests adaptations had already been made based on Portuguese maps plundered from the feitoria in 1509. With such knowledge, the Portuguese learned the path to the fabled "Spice Islands", and in November, Albuquerque organized an expedition of three naus and 120 men to reach them, under the command of António de Abreu, who had previously been in command of the junk. He was the first European to sail into the Pacific Ocean.

As Albuquerque was preparing to leave Malacca, he received deputations of the merchants requesting him to stay. When he left Malacca in January 1512, the inhabitants mourned his departure. Around the northwesternmost tip of Sumatra, the fleet faced a storm that wrecked Albuquerque's flagship, the Flor do Mar, with the loss of paperwork, an official letter from the King of Ayutthaya and the spoils and gifts intended for King Manuel, with the exception of a large ruby, a decorated sword and a golden goblet sent by the King of Ayutthaya which the crew managed to salvage.

In 1513, Jorge Álvares would set sail from Malacca and arrive in Canton, making contact with China.

=== Defence of Malacca and the fate of Mahmud Shah ===
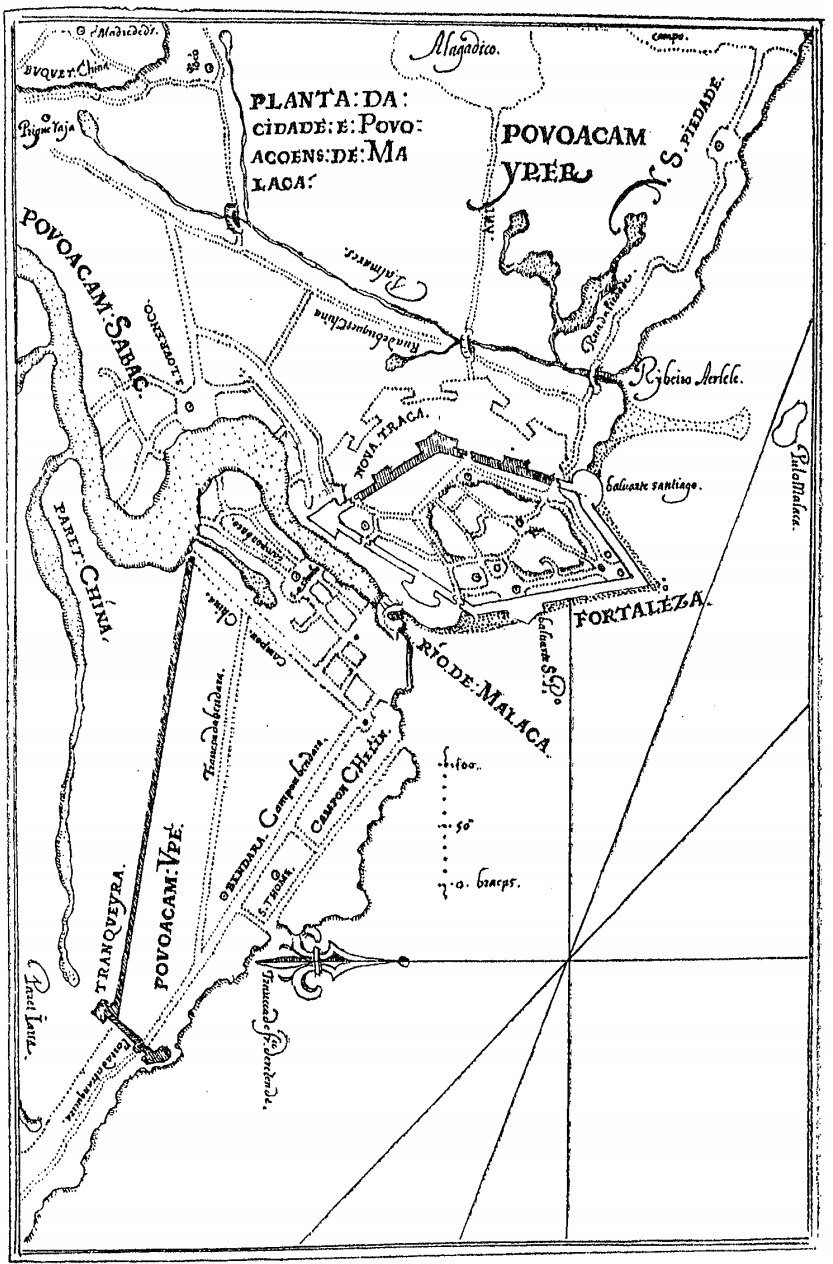
Portuguese map of the city of Malacca (with the new set of walls built in 1564)

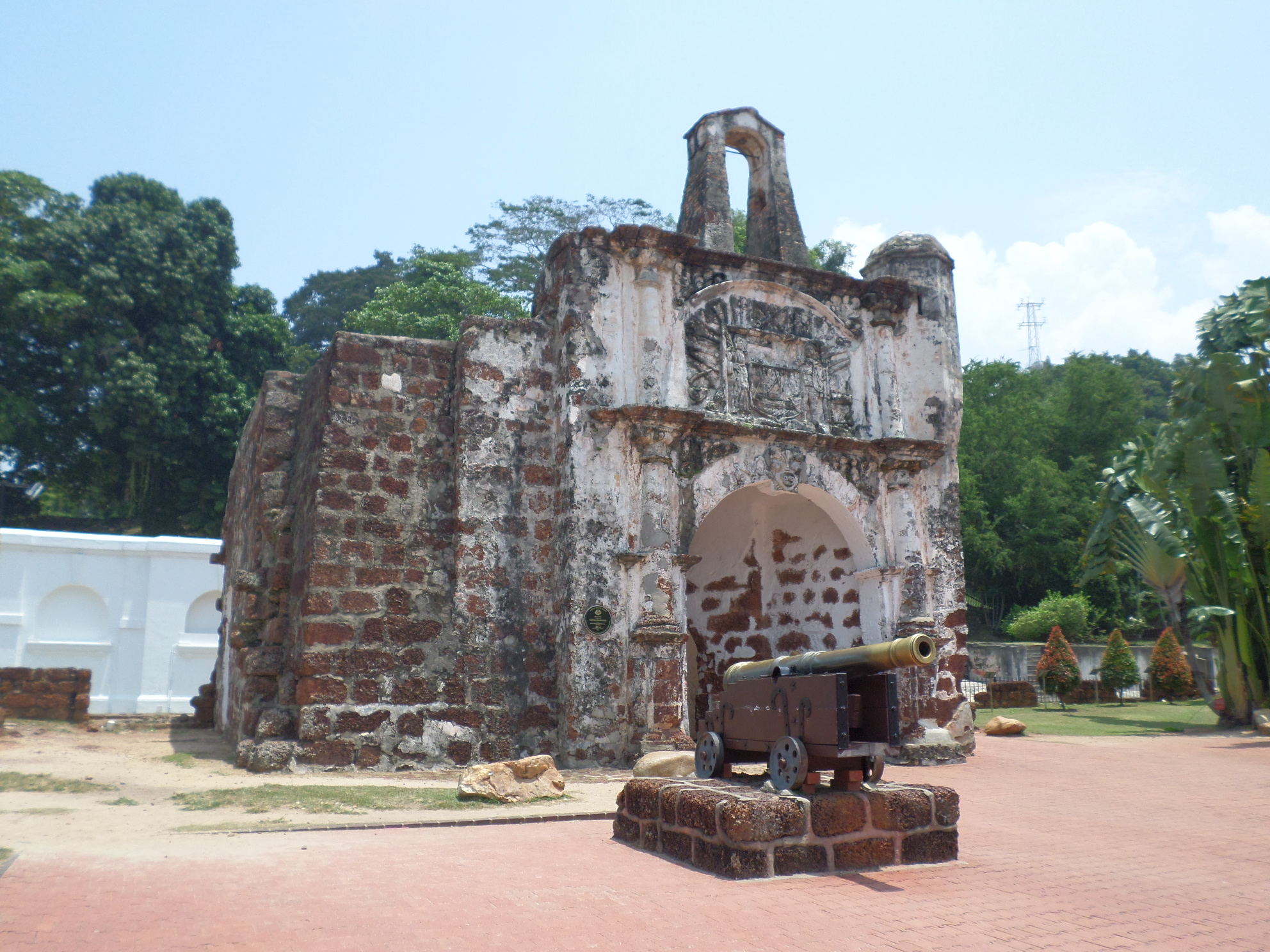
The surviving gate of the Fortress of Malacca, Porta do Santiago

Shortly after Albuquerque's departure, the city suffered harassment by the forces of Mahmud Shah, but by then the Portuguese could count on over 500 men provided by the inhabitants of the city to assist them in repelling the attack. In May, the Portuguese, along with over 2,000 local allies under the command of Gaspar de Paiva, forced the sultan out of his encampment by the Muar River.

Mahmud Shah then retreated to the Pahang Sultanate, where he narrowly avoided an assassination attempt. From there he dispatched an ambassador to China seeking help against the Portuguese, but the Chinese merchants got there first and the ambassador got nothing for his trouble. The envoy apparently died of digust and had an epitaph enscribed on his tomb which read: "Here lies Tuan Nacem, ambassador, and uncle of the great King of Malacca, who died before he was avenged of the captain Albuquerque, lion of sea robbers!"

Afterwards, Mahmud moved to Bintan, an island kingdom south-east of Singapore that he usurped to wage war on the Portuguese in Malacca, harassing the city, its trade and sabotaging their diplomatic relations with China, until the Portuguese eventually devastated Bintan in 1526, returning it to its previous ruler and vassalizing the kingdom.

Mahmud Shah then retreated to Kampar, Sumatra and led a government-in-exile there until he died in 1527. His son, Alauddin, would go on to found the Sultanate of Johor, and develop more or less pragmatical relations with the Portuguese.

== See also ==
- Fortress of Malacca
- Portuguese Malacca
- Portuguese India
- Kristang people
- Malay-Portuguese conflicts
  - Battle of Pago
  - Battle of Lingga
  - Siege of Bintan
  - Battle of Ugentana
  - Battle of Ugentana (1536)
  - Siege of Johor (1587)
- War of the League of the Indies
- Acehnese-Portuguese conflicts
  - Siege of Malacca (1568)
- Dutch Malacca
- Portuguese Empire in the Indonesian Archipelago
