= Battle of Pago =

Successful Portuguese siege on Bintan

- Part of Malay–Portuguese conflicts
Date	1520
Location	Pagoh
Result	Portuguese victory

Belligerents
Portuguese Empire	Sultanate of Bintan

Commanders and leaders
António Correia	Sultan Mahmud

Strength
2 carracks, 1 caravel, 2–4 galliots 150 Portuguese soldiers 300 Malay auxiliaries	2,000 men 100 lancharas

Casualties and losses
Few	Unknown

The Battle of Pago was a military operation that took place in 1520, in which Portuguese forces successfully attacked Pago, where the former Sultan of Malacca Mahmud Shah had built a fortified camp to harass Portuguese Malacca.

== Context ==
The second governor of Portuguese India Afonso de Albuquerque captured the Malay city of Malacca in 1511, but the Sultan of Malacca Mahmud Shah survived the battle and fled with his Court and army. He later built a base at Pago, upstream of the Muar River, from where he harassed the city of Malacca by land and sea, in the hopes of recovering it.

To deal with the threat, governor Lopo Soares de Albergaria, dispatched three ships and 300 soldiers to Malacca under the command of Dom Aleixo de Meneses, which arrived in June 1518. He blockaded the mouth of the Muar River and so the sultan sought terms. Inexperienced, Dom Aleixo naively accepted a peace treaty, but after he departed with his men to Goa, the Mahmud Shah laid siege to Malacca on land, while 85 lancharas attacked from the sea. He was unable to overcome Portuguese defenses and after 17 days called off the attack, having suffering 600 dead to the Portuguese's 15.

A Javanese captain whose wife the sultan had apparently taken defected to the Portuguese, and revealed the sultan's defenses at Muar. The Portuguese directed an expedition to the mouth of the river, where they destroyed a fortified stockade the sultan had built across the water, capturing 60 cannons.

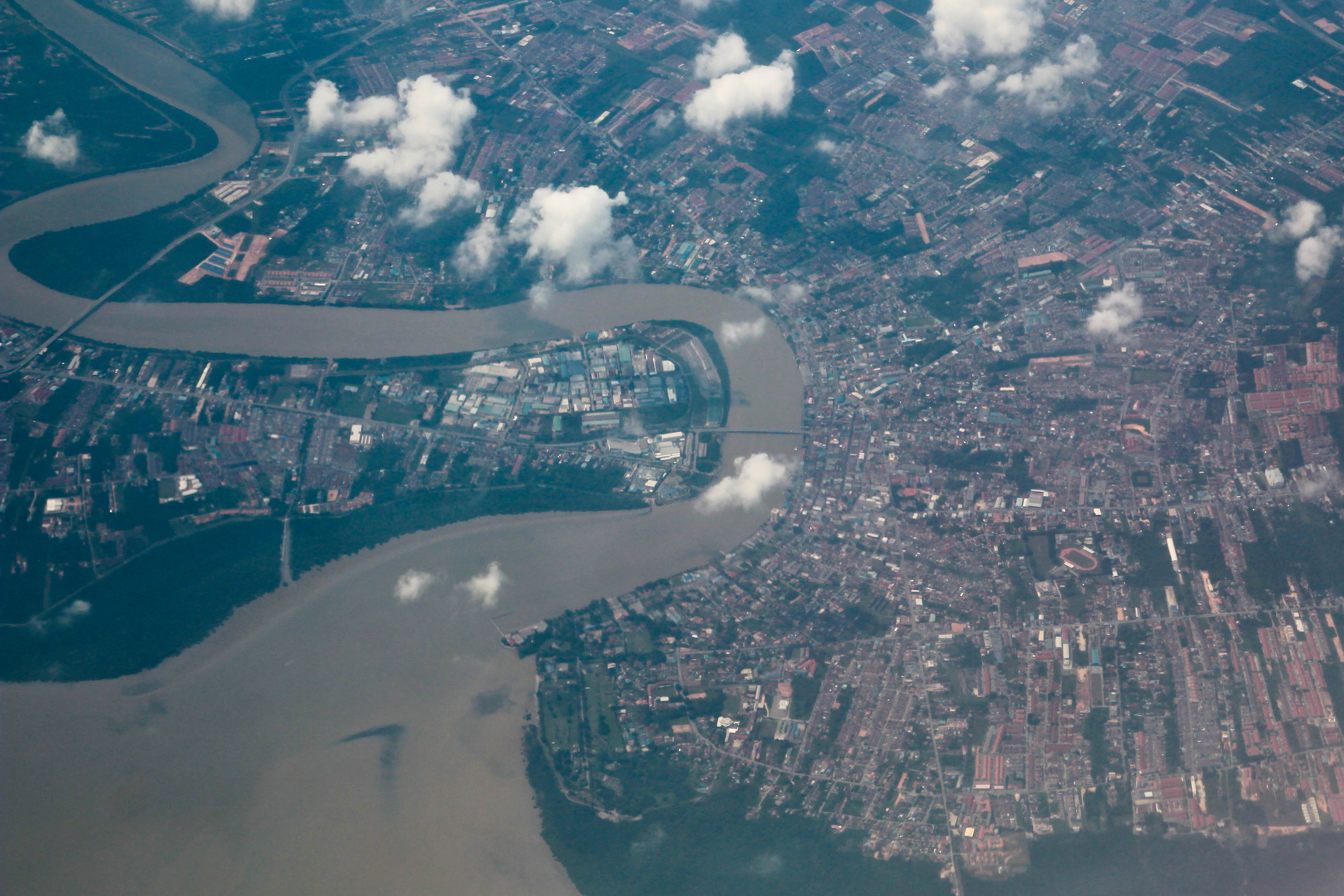
Aerial photograph of the mouth of the Muar river in Malaysia.

When Dom Aleixo informed the governor of the situation at Malacca, he dispatched two carracks, a caravel, a brigantine and 150 soldiers under the command of António Correia to the city, while Garcia de Sá was appointed as new captain of Malacca.

With these reinforcements, the Portuguese were able to force all of the Sultans men still in the vicinity of Malacca to withdraw to Pago in September 1519, after two months fighting. On July 15 1520 António Correia set out to disperse Mahmud Shah's camp at Pago, with 150 Portuguese and 300 Malay auxiliaries on a small flotilla of 2 carracks, 1 caravel, 2–4 galliots and a number of Malay lancharas.

== The Battle of Pago ==
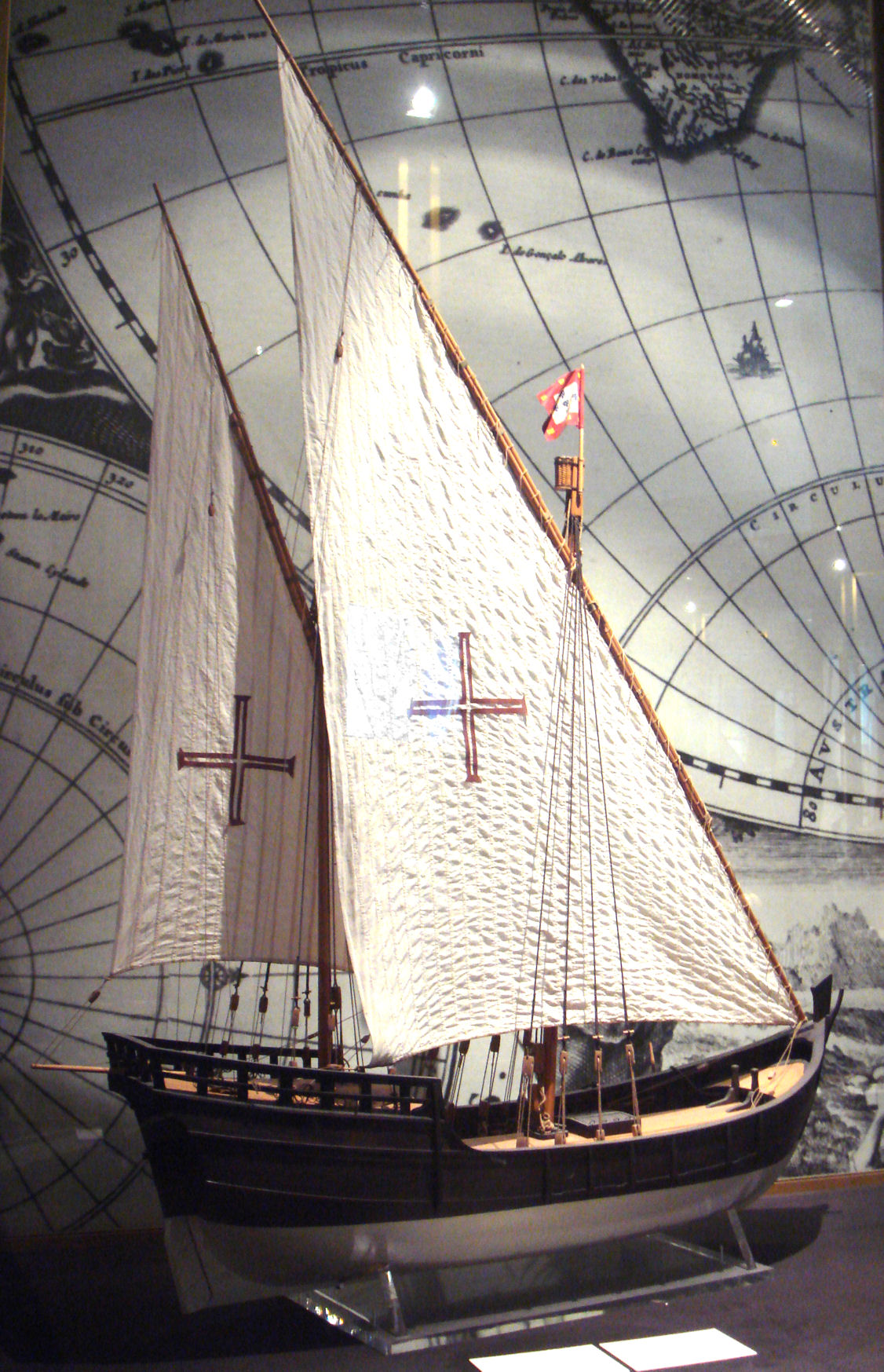
Model of a Portuguese caravel.

Sailing up the Muar, the Portuguese found another fortified stockade built across the river close to Pago. Correia had it attacked by a caravel equipped with pavises and heavy caliber artillery, towed by the longboats. Despite the opposition of Malay fire and poisoned arrows, Portuguese soldiers assaulted the stockade, and captured it after a brief fight while the sailors opened the door to allow their ships to pass through.

The caravel and the carracks were left behind to keep watch, and further up the river the Portuguese found the access to Pago blocked by numerous vertical wooden stakes driven into the river floor, along with numerous trees and logs felled into the water. They were moved out of the by a team of Portuguese carpenters, the sailors and the soldiers, until they reached Pago, where the Sultan had 2,000 men and war-elephants.

Although Correia had ordered no man to engage before they had all landed in good order, he was ignored by his officers and soldiers; they disembarked under the cover of the vessel's artillery, and attacked the sultan's forces onshore, which were forced to abandon their position and escape into the jungle after a brief clash.

== Aftermath ==
Correia armed a number of fidalgos as knights at some houses that had belonged to the sultan. Considerable spoil and some prisoners of war were captured at Pago while the sultan's fleet, numbering over 100 oarvessels was torched. Two large vessels, with gilded bows and stern were taken to Malacca as war-trophies.

After being defeated at Pago, many of the sultan's captains defected, and lacking a fleet he withdrew via Pahang to Bintan Island, which he usurped from the native king and from where he would continue to fight the Portuguese in the future.

The attack on Pago was later recorded in the Malay Annals, which reads:

In a short time the Frangis appeared before Pagar and prepared to attack it. In a few days, Sang Satia died, and Pagoh was taken, and Sultan Ahmed made his retreat, and went up the river to Panarigan. The lame bandahara died, and was buried at Lubu Batu (the stone-plumbs) which is generally termed Bender-Lubu-Batu. After this, Sultan Ahmed, with Sultan Mahmud, returned to Pahang, and Sultan Abdal Jamil received them with great kindness, and conducted him into the city, with a thousand testimonies of respect and honour.

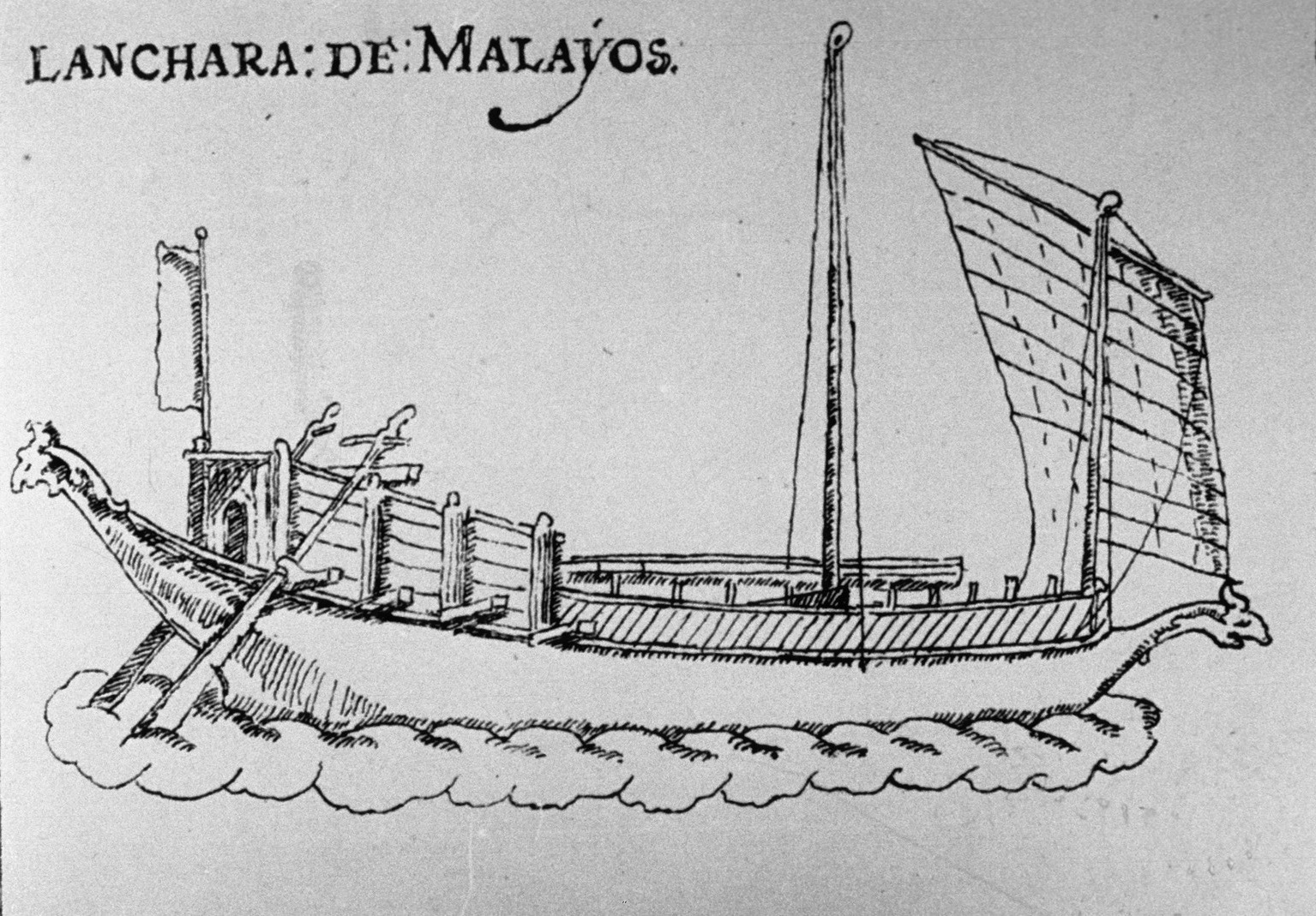
Portuguese depiction of a "Malay lanchara"

== See also ==
- Portuguese Malacca
- Portuguese conquest of Malacca
- Battle of Lingga
- Siege of Bintan
