= Battle of Lingga =

Successful Portuguese battle in the Lingga archipelago

- Part of Malay–Portuguese conflicts
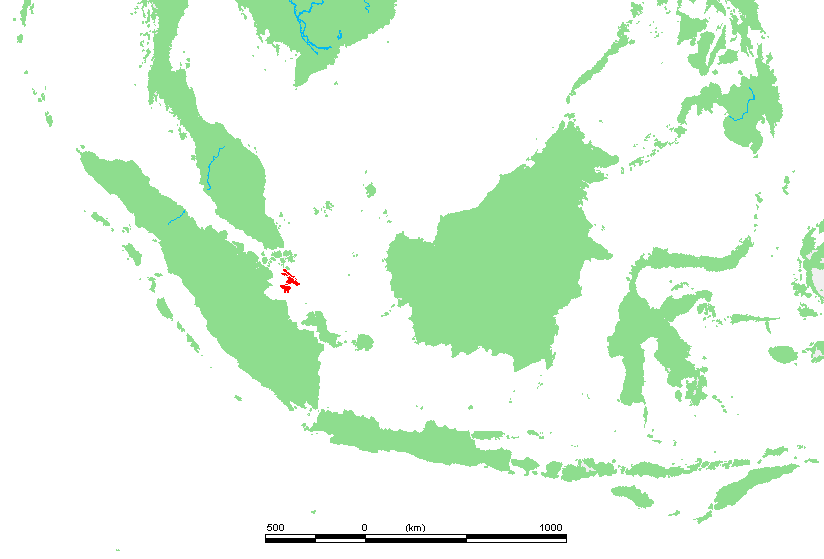
- Location of the Lingga Islands
Date	1525
Location	Lingga Island
Result	Portuguese victory

Belligerents
Portuguese Empire	Sultanate of Bintan; Sultanate of Indragiri

Commanders and leaders
Álvaro de Brito; Baltasar Raposo	Sultan of Indragiri; Laqueximena

Strength
2 carracks, 80 soldiers	160 lancharas 2,000 men

Casualties and losses
1 dead, 17 wounded	80 vessels lost, 600 dead

The Battle of Lingga was a naval engagement that took place in 1525 and in which Portuguese forces defeated a fleet belonging to the Sultan of Bintan (former Sultan of Malacca) and the Sultan of Indragiri, in defense of their ally, the Sultan of Lingga.

== Context ==
When the Governor of Portuguese India Afonso de Albuquerque captured the Malay city of Malacca, its ruler Sultan Mahmud Shah fled with his remaining forces to Bintan, where he usurped its native ruler. He built a new city there, rallied several states in the region against the Portuguese and continuously harassed Malacca by land and sea.

When the Sultan of Lingga revolted against the suzerainty of Mahmud Shah he promptly allied with the Portuguese, and ships from Lingga could often be found in Malacca acquiring weapons and selling foodstuffs.

Mahmud Shah's persuaded his son-in-law the Sultan of Indragiri in Sumatra to blockade Lingga with his fleet. It was joined by Mahmud's own fleet commanded by his admiral, once it returned from a failed raid on Malacca, the two fleets numbering 160 oarships.

The Sultan of Lingga had already requested support from the Portuguese, and the captain of Malacca Jorge de Albuquerque sent two small carracks with 80 soldiers to aid him, under the command of Baltasar Rodrigues Raposo and Álvaro de Brito.

== Battle ==
The Portuguese anchored behind a few islands "a shot of falcão away from the island of Linga" seeking to hide their presence from the hostile fleet blockading Lingga, however they were spotted by a vessel keeping watch. The following morning, a small craft was spotted sounding the depths of the waters around the carracks, and realizing the enemy fleet would soon be upon them, the Portuguese made ready for battle: they tied both ships together, replaced the anchor ropes for chains so they wouldn't be cut; readied the arquebuses, artillery and the gunpowder bombs which they had brought in abundance; and set up pavises and purposely-made long bamboo mats over the rigging down to the sides of the ships so enemy grappling hooks would slide off if they attempted to board.

Shortly before midday, the two Portuguese vessels where attacked by the large enemy fleet, which advanced, divided in two squadrons, draped in banners and making noise with their war instruments and the shouting of the crews. The large and compact mass of shallow, open-topped vessels made an ideal target for Portuguese artillery: 12 were sunk or disabled by the first salvo. As the Portuguese shouted Vitória, Vitória, they fired their arquebuses, while the Malays released poisoned arrows and fired their artillery; once they were a stones-throw away, the Malays were subjected to a hail of bombs, costing them a further 17 vessels.

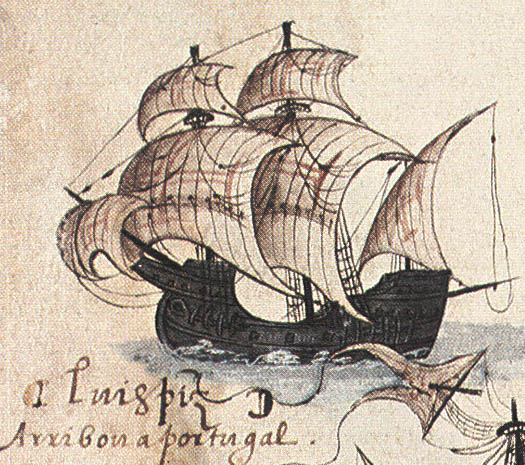
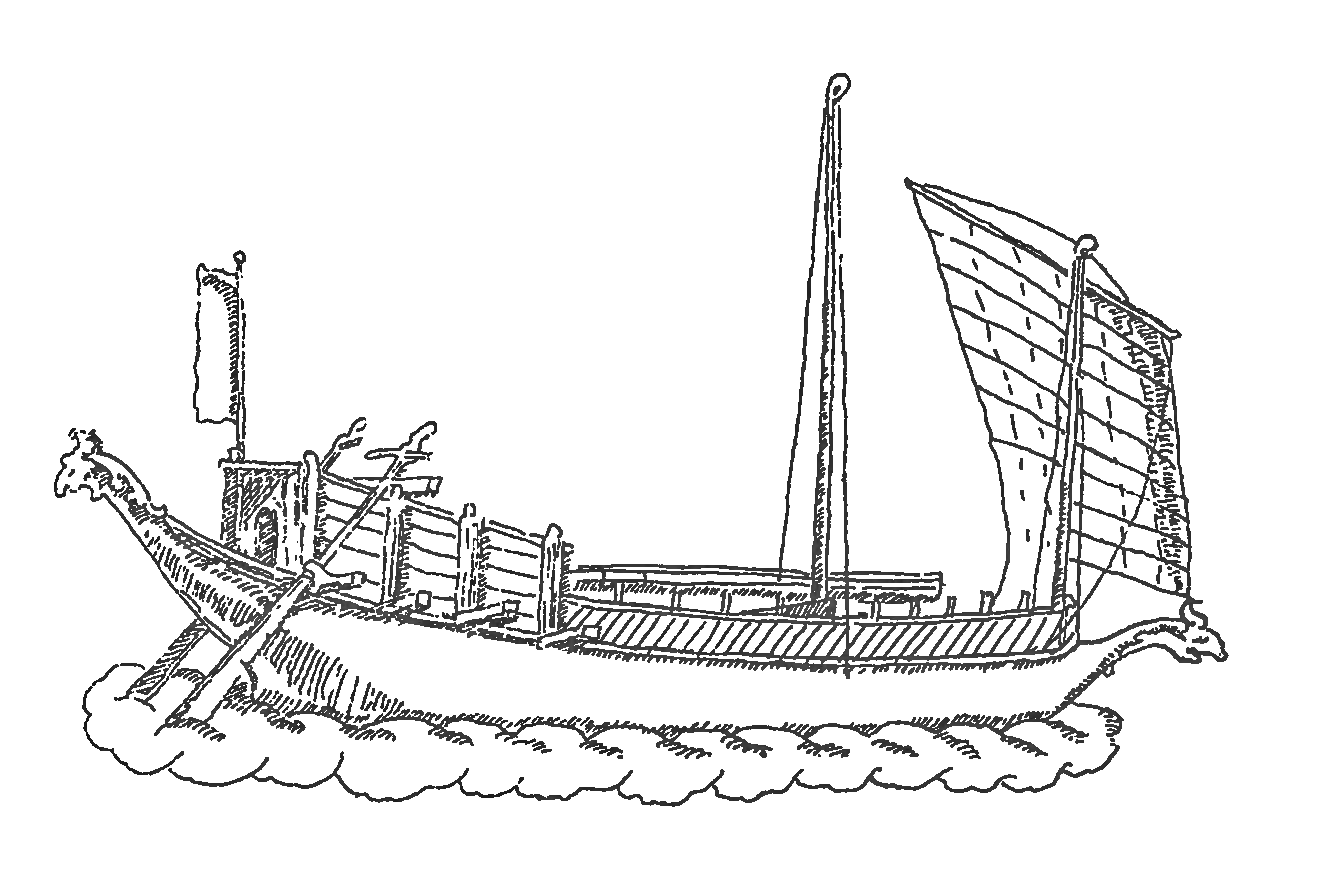
Portuguese nau and Malayan lanchara.

An accident involving the handling of the bombs caused the mizzen of one of the Portuguese carracks to catch fire; at this moment, a number of Malay vessels grappled the ship from its stern sector and managed to enter through the gun-ports on each side of the rudder, but they were killed or forced out. A deadly close-range salvo from the stern guns broke the morale of the Malays, causing them to scatter against the wishes of their commanders.

After the battle, the Portuguese found to have sunk or disabled about 80 vessels, and estimated the Malays dead at 600. The following morning they were met by the Sultan of Lingga in person, and were escorted to his city for long festivities held in their honor.

== See also ==
- Portuguese Malacca
- Portuguese conquest of Malacca
- Siege of Bintan
