= Siege of Bintan =

Successful Portuguese siege on Bintan

Battle of Bintan
- Part of Malay–Portuguese conflicts
Date	1526
Location	Bintan Island
Result	Portuguese victory

Belligerents
Portuguese Empire	Sultanate of Malacca; Sultanate of Pahang

Commanders and leaders
Dom Pedro Mascarenhas; Tuão Mafamede	Mahmud Shah of Malacca; Mahmud Shah I of Pahang; Unrecorded allied ruler

Strength
1 galleon 3 carracks 2 caravels 1 galley 1 half-galley 5 light-galleys 2 armed batels 600 Portuguese soldiers 300 Malay auxiliaries Unrecorded number of sailors and combat slaves	30,000 men 20 oarships Sultan of Pahang: 30 oarships 2,000 men

Casualties and losses
Few	Unknown

The siege of Bintan of 1526 was a military operation in which Portuguese forces successfully sieged, assaulted and destroyed the city of Bintan (Bintão, in Portuguese), capital of the former Sultan of Malacca Mahmud Shah.

== Context ==
In 1511, the second Governor of Portuguese India Afonso de Albuquerque captured the Malay city of Malacca. Sultan Mahmud Shah fled with his forces to Bintan, where he usurped its ruler. He built a new city and fleet there, and continuously harassed Portuguese Malacca and its shipping.

The captain of Malacca, Dom Pedro Mascarenhas had dispatched a flotilla of oarships to Bintan to blockade it.

Promoted by King John III to the position of Governor of India in 1526 but unable to sail to Goa due to the weather, Dom Pedro decided to take advantage of the unusually high number of soldiers then available at Malacca to put an end to the threat posed by Mahmud Shah.

Pedro Mascarenhas first put a rumour into circulation that his expedition was to carry out the construction of a fort at the Sunda Strait. He departed Malacca on October 23, 1526, with a galleon, a carrack, two small carracks, two caravels, one galley, one half-galley, five light-galleys and two armed batels equipped with heavy caliber camelos and pavises, bearing about 600 Portuguese soldiers. They were further supported by an unrecorded number of escravos de peleja ("combat slaves") and 400 auxiliary Malays, under the command of Tuão Mafamede.

== The siege ==
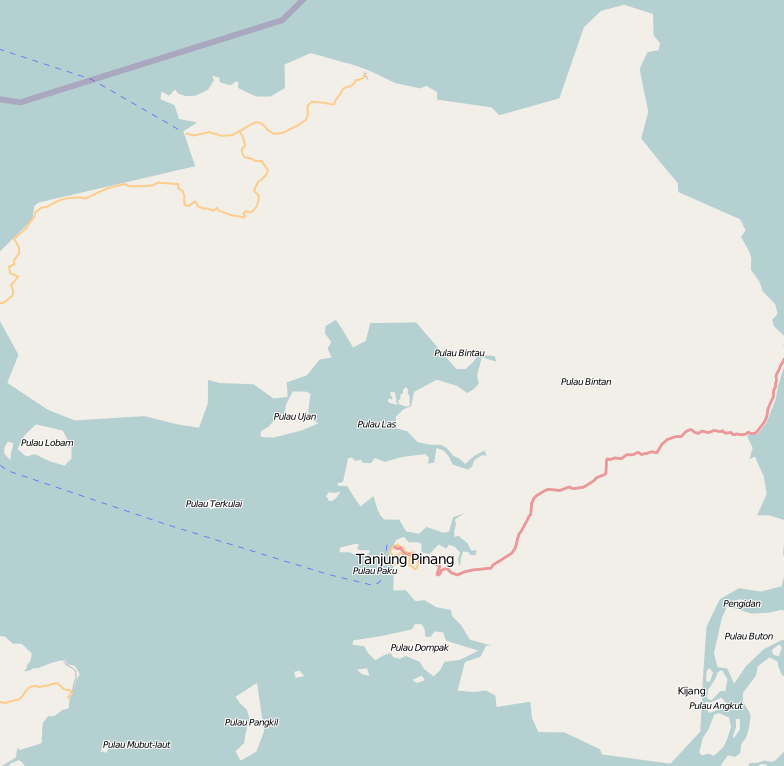
The Island of Bintan.

The city of Bintan was located on a small island, connected by a fortified bridge to a larger crescent-shaped island that surrounded it. The Portuguese found its main defenses to be the mangrove swamps that made landings perilous, complemented by a moat surrounding the city, poisoned timber stakes, and a tall stockade furnished with artillery. Heavy ships like the galleons and carracks could only approach the city via a narrow canal, which was blocked by vertical wooden stakes driven into the seabed. On a small hill in the middle of the city, surrounded by another stockade furnished with artillery stood the fortified dwellings of Sultan Mahmud. However, the sultan's fleet had been reduced to 20 oarships that had survived a recent battle with the Portuguese at Linga.

Although Mascarenhas could assault the city with only his light oarvessels, he decided instead for a safer drawn-out siege, where he would blockade the island and slowly remove all the stakes from the canal, allowing the larger ships to bombard the city with their heavy artillery when it was assaulted.

=== The approach to the city ===
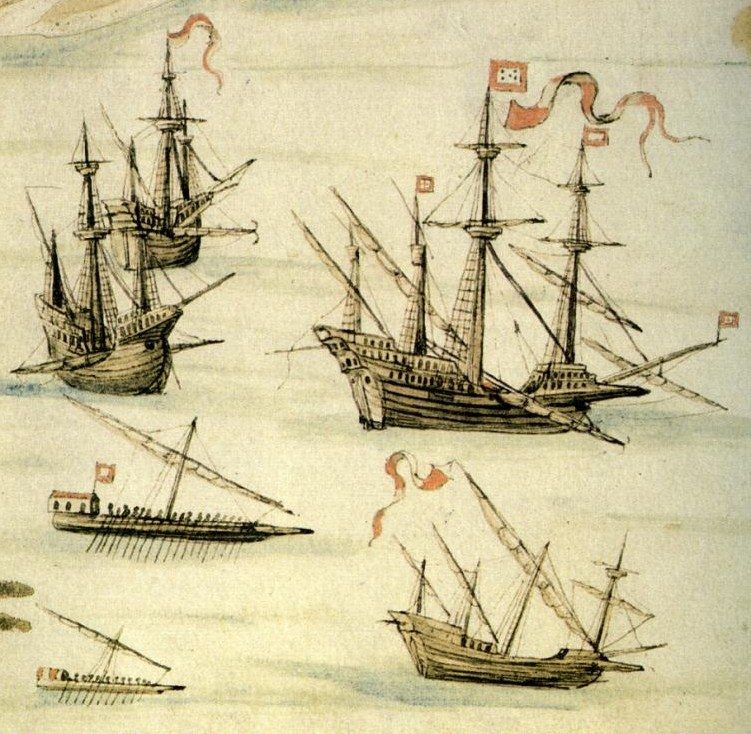
Portuguese galleon, carracks, round-caravel and oarships, depicted by Dom João de Castro in Roteiro do Mar Roxo, 1540.

The Portuguese began by bombarding a stockade Mahmud Shah had built on an islet by the entrance to the canal, with the galleon, a carrack and the two batels protected by pavises and heavy rope mats. The Sultan's forces responded with their own artillery which was lighter than those of the Portuguese. Unable to seriously damage their vessels, the Sultan's forces abandoned the islet an hour later and the Portuguese captured 20 light artillery pieces there. The following day, the Portuguese proceeded in similar manner against another stockade located on another islet protecting the channel, which was likewise abandoned.

The Portuguese then set about painstakingly removing the hundreds of wooden stakes blocking the entrance of the heavy ships, and made of a wood the Portuguese dubbed pau-ferro, literally, "iron-wood", all while under fire of the Sultan's artillery.

After ten days, the Portuguese were attacked by a flotilla of 30 lancharas and 2,000 men dispatched by an ally of Sultan Mahmud, the Sultan of Pahang, then at war with the Portuguese. They retreated after a stiff but brief fight in which the Portuguese captured 18 vessels.

After 24 days, all stakes had been removed and the Portuguese anchored their fleet close to the main bulwark that defended the city and the bridge.

=== Battle within the channel ===
Very early the following day, the Sultan's forces attacked the Portuguese galley and caravel with their 20 oarships as they were closest to the city. Both vessels were grappled and boarded, but the Sultan's forces were unable to overcome their defenders before being forced to retreat by the two Portuguese longboats equipped with heavy-caliber artillery, led by Pedro de Mascarenhas, who had boarded a boat with twenty soldiers. 13 oarships were captured, and the Sultan's admiral was found among the dead.

=== Assault on the city ===
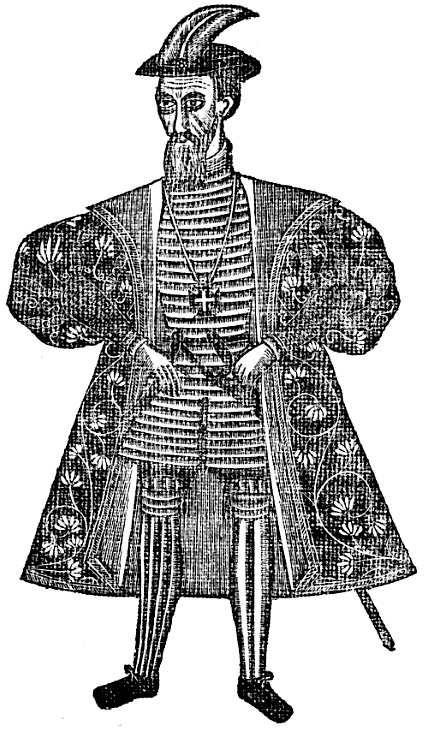
Dom Pedro Mascarenhas.

That night, the Portuguese learned from a Malay boy that the city could be most easily stormed via the bridge, and this information was confirmed by a Portuguese POW who had fled the city.

Very early on the following day, Mascarenhas landed 100 Portuguese soldiers and 300 Malays on the island on which the city of Bintan stood, and under the protection of the ships artillery had a small stockade equipped with light artillery built on the beach. Believing the Portuguese would assault the city from there, the Sultan's forces concentrated most of their forces on the city facing that side.

As midnight approached however, Mascarenhas personally led 300 Portuguese soldiers, 100 combat slaves and Malay auxiliaries ashore on the crescent shaped island, through the muddy mangrove swamp that at times covered the Portuguese to their waists, in the middle of pitch-black darkness in absolute silence.

As day broke, the Portuguese fleet opened fire and its crewmen landed as they sounded their trumpets, which drew the attention of the Sultan's forces away from the bridge. Mascarenhas ordered the assault on the stockade that defended the entrance to the bridge, the Portuguese throwing clay bombs filled with gunpowder, sending its few defenders into a flight. The city was then stormed, the sailors having taken part in the assault, throwing clay bombs. By 10am the city had been taken.

That day, the Portuguese were joined by their ally, the Sultan of Linga, accompanied by 20 oarvessels, who helped with mop-up operations.

== Aftermath ==
Banner with the Cross of the Order of Christ, used by the Portuguese on land and sea in the 16th century.

The Portuguese captured rich spoil, including 300 pieces of artillery. The city was then torched. The islands of Bintan were then restored to its former ruler, whom Sultan Mahmud had displaced and who agreed to become an ally of Portugal.

The Portuguese managed to capture a great number of the sultan's court, servants, harem and part of his royal treasure in the vicinity of the city, where they killed many who had not been able to flee in time. The harem was gifted to the Sultan of Linga, an ally of the Portuguese. Mascarenhas remained in Bintan for 15 days, capturing and dividing spoils, organizing the voyage back home, and hunting for those who had fled, but which the Portuguese found impossible to pursue into the jungle.

Mahmud Shah had been among the first to flee the city, and he survived the battle. The Sultan escaped through the jungle and fled to Kampar on Sumatra, where he died two years later.

The defeat of the former Sultan of Malacca at Bintan impressed many rulers around the Strait of Malacca, who sent the Portuguese embassies seeking treaties, which afforded Malacca great prosperity for many years after.

== See also ==
- Portuguese Malacca
