= Abdul Majid =

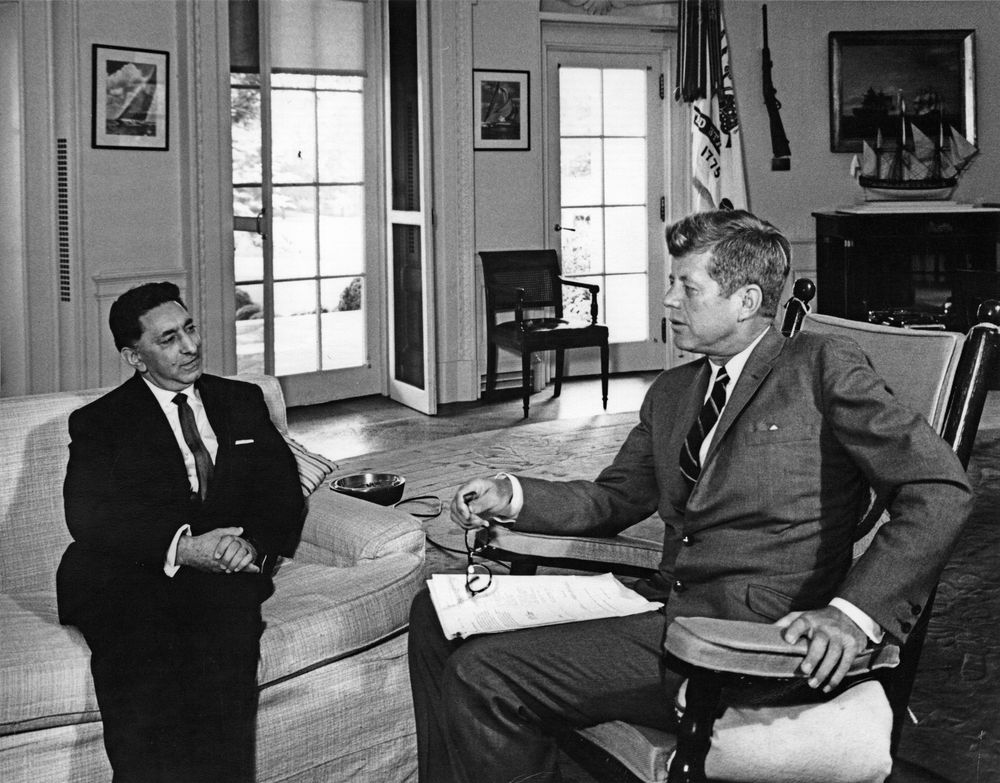
President John F. Kennedy (in rocking chair) meets with the newly-appointed Ambassador of Afghanistan, Dr. Abdul Majid; the ambassador met with President Kennedy to present his credentials. Oval Office, White House, Washington, D.C.

ʻAbd al-Majīd (ALA-LC romanization of Arabic: عبد المجيد, Persian: عبدالمجید), also spelled as Abd ul Majid, Abd ul-Majid, Abd ol Majid, Abd ol-Majid, and Abdolmajid, is a Muslim male given name and, in modern usage, surname. It is a combination of the Arabic words ʻabd and al-Majīd, one of the names of God in the Qur'an, which give rise to the Muslim theophoric names. It means "servant of the All-glorious". It is rendered in Turkish as Abdülmecid.

There is a distinct but closely related name, ʻAbd al-Mājid (Arabic: عبد الماجد), with a similar meaning, formed on the Qur'anic name al-Mājid. Some of the names below are instance of the latter one.

'Abd al-Majid may refer to:

== People ==
=== Given name ===
- 'Abd al-Majid Nimer Zaghmout (died 2000), Palestinian imprisoned in Syria
- Abdelmadjid Benatia (born 1984), Algerian footballer
- Abdelmadjid Mada (born 1953), Algerian runner
- Abdelmadjid Meskoud (1953–2026), Algerian chaabi singer
- Abdelmadjid Sidi Said (born 1949), Algerian politician
- Abdelmadjid Tahraoui (born 1981), Algerian footballer
- Abdelmadjid Tebboune (born 1945), President of Algeria
- Abdelmajid Ben Belgacem (born 1986), Tunisian footballer
- Abdelmajid Benjelloun (1919–1981), Moroccan novelist, journalist and ambassador
- Abdelmajid Benjelloun (historian) (born 1944), Moroccan author, historian and poet
- Abdelmajid Bourebbou (born 1951), Algerian footballer
- Abdelmajid Bouyboud (born 1966), Moroccan footballer
- Abdelmajid Chaker (1927–2021), Tunisian politician
- Abdelmajid Chetali (born 1939), Tunisian footballer
- Abdelmajid Dahoumane (born 1967), Algerian alleged terrorist
- Abdelmajid Djae (born 2005), Comorian footballer
- Abdelmajid Dolmy (1953–2017), Moroccan footballer
- Abdelmajid Eddine (born 1979), Moroccan footballer
- Abdelmajid Hadry (born 1952), Moroccan footballer
- Abd el-Majid Hidr, original name of Amos Yarkoni (1920–1991), Israeli Arab soldier
- Abdelmajid El Hissouf (born 1992), Moroccan runner
- Abdelmajid Lakhal (1939–2014), Tunisian theatre and film actor
- Abdelmajid Lamriss (born 1959), Moroccan footballer
- Abdelmajide Moncif (born 1961), Moroccan runner
- Abdelmajid Oulmers (born 1978), Moroccan footballer
- Abdelmajid R'chich (born 1942), Moroccan filmmaker
- Abdelmajid Saleh, Lebanese politician
- Abdelmajid Sebbata (born 1989), Moroccan writer and translator
- Abdelmajid Tlemçani (1937–2020), Tunisian footballer
- Abdel Meguid Amir (born 1961), Egyptian basketball player
- Abdel Meguid Mahmoud (born 1946), Egyptian attorney general
- Abdolmajid Mahdavi Damghani, Iranian agroecologist
- Abdolmajid Eskandari, Iranian academic
- Abdol Majid Majidi (1928–2014), Iranian politician
- Abdol Majid Mirza (1845–1927), Qajar prince and Prime Minister of Iran
- Abdol Majid Taleqani (1737/38–1771/72), Iranian calligrapher
- Abdul Madzhid (Dagestan rebel) (1974–2008), leader in the Second Chechen War
- Abdul Majeed (cricketer, born 1993), Pakistani cricketer
- Abdul Majeed (footballer) (born 1966), Pakistani footballer
- Abdul Majeed (Kalat cricketer), Pakistani cricketer
- Abdul Majeed (politician) (born 1950), Bangladeshi politician
- Abdul Majeed Abdullah (born 1962), Saudi singer
- Abdul Majeed Abdul Bari (1963–2018), Maldivian politician and Islamic scholar
- Abdul Majeed Khan Achakzai (born 1962), Pakistani politician
- Abdul Majeed Akhund, Afghan politician
- Abdul Majeed Badini, Pakistani politician
- Abdul Majeed Dar (died 2003), Kashmiri separatist leader
- Abdul Majeed Didi (1873–1952), Sultan of the Maldives
- Abdul Majeed Kakroo, Indian footballer
- Abdul Majeed Khan (born 1963), Pakistani politician
- Abdul Majeed Khwaja (1885–1962), Indian lawyer, educationist, social reformer and freedom fighter
- Abdul Majeed Ludhianvi (1934–2015), Pakistani Islamic scholar
- Abdul Majeed Mahir (1927/1928–2024), Maldivian political activist
- Abdul Majeed Maruwala (born 1963), Pakistani wrestler
- Abdul Majeed Khan Niazi (born 1980), Pakistani politician
- Abdul Majeed bin Abdulaziz Al Saud (1942–2007), Saudi prince
- Abdul Majeed Waris (born 1991), Ghanaian footballer
- Abdul Majeed al-Zindani (1942–2024), Yemeni academic and politician
- Abdul Majid (football coach), Kenyan football coach
- Abdul Majid (justice) (1868–1924), Bengali justice and scholar
- Abdul Majid (physicist) (born 1941), Pakistani astrophysicist
- Abdulmajid Anad (born 1994), Qatari footballer
- Abdul Majid Arfaei (1939–2026), Iranian researcher and elamitologist
- Abdul Majid Chowdhury (1860–1912), Bengali educationist
- Abdul Majid Cockar (1923–2016), Kenyan lawyer
- Abdul Majid Daryabadi (1892–1977), Indian Muslim writer and exegete of the Qur'an
- Abdulmajid Dostiev (born 1946), Tajik diplomat
- Abdul Majid Giaka (born 1960), Libyan double-agent for the CIA
- Abdul Majid Hassan (1380–1408), Sultan of Brunei
- Abdul Majid Hussein (born 1944), Ethiopian politician
- Abdul Majid Kabar (1909–1988), Libyan politician
- Abdul Majid Khalil (1935–2021), Sudanese politician
- Abdul Majid Khan, multiple people
- Abdul-Majid al-Khoei (1962–2003), Iraqi Twelver cleric
- Abdul Majid Kubar (1909–1988), Libyan politician
- Abdul Majid Mahmoud (born 1979), Pakistani held in Guantanamo
- Abdul Majid Mallick, Bangladeshi politician
- Abdul Majid Mandal (1948–2021), Bangladeshi politician
- Abdul Majid Tara Mia (1925–1988), Bangladeshi politician
- Abdul Majid Muhammed (born 1978), Iranian held in Guantanamo
- Abdul Majid Padder (born 1958), Indian politician
- Abdul Majid al-Qa′ud (1943–2021), Libyan politician
- Abdul Majid Rouzi (born 1948), Afghan soldier
- Abdul Majid Samim, Afghan politician
- Abdul Majid Sindhi (1889–1978), Sindhi writer and politician
- Abdul Majid Talukdar (1920–2002), Bangladeshi politician
- Abdulmajid Tapa Tchermoev (1882–1937), Chechen statesman
- Abdul Majid Thuneibat (1945–2022), Jordanian politician
- Abdul Majid Zabuli (1896–1998), Afghan banker
- Abdülmecid I (1823–1861), Sultan of the Ottoman Empire
- Abdülmecid II (1868–1944), Head of the Ottoman Imperial House and the final Ottoman Caliph
- Abdul Mejid (explorer), Anglo-Afghan mullah, merchant, and explorer of Central Asia

=== Surname ===
- Hussein 'Abd al-Majid (disappeared 1936), Iraqi, Saddam Hussein's father
- Khalid ‘Abd al-Majid (born 1960), Palestinian politician
- Ali Hassan Abd al-Majid al-Tikriti, or just Ali Hassan al-Majid (1941–2010), Iraqi politician
- Atif Abdelmageed, Sudanese scout
- Bassam Abdel Majeed (born 1950), Syrian politician
- M. N. Abdul Majeed (born 1957), Sri Lankan politician
- Asia Abdelmajid, Sudanese actress
- Ahmed Asmat Abdel-Meguid (1923–2013), Egyptian diplomat
- Chaudhry Abdul Majeed (1937–2006), Pakistani nuclear physicist
- Qazi Abdul Majeed Abid (1915–1996), Pakistani politician
- Chaudhry Abdul Majid (born 1946), Pakistani Kashmiri politician
- Iman Mohamed Abdulmajid, or Iman (model), (born 1955), Somali-American model, actress and entrepreneur
- Munshi Abdul Majid (born 1952), Afghan politician
- S. M. Abdul Majid, Indian politician
- Syed Abdul Majid (1872–1922), Bengali lawyer, politician and entrepreneur
- Shah Abdul Majid Qureshi (1915–2003), Bangladeshi restaurateur and social reformer
- Tun Habib Abdul Majid (1637–1697), Bendahara of the Johor Sultanate
- Tunku Abdul Majid (born 1970), Tunku Bendahara of Johor

== See also ==
- "Heroes" (David Bowie album), a David Bowie album including an instrumental piece named "Abdulmajid" as a bonus track on its 1991 reissue
- Abdulmajidia, genus of Malayan plants
