= Al Jadid =

Al Jadid (Arabic: الجديد, lit. 'the new'), also spelled al-Jdayde, al-Judaydah, El Gedid, may refer to:

== Media ==
- Al Jadid (magazine), literary magazine on Arabic literature
- Aljadidah, online magazine

== Placenames ==
=== Asia ===
- Al Judayyidah, town in Jordan
- Al-Judayyda, district in Jordan
- Al-Judeida (Jenin), town in Palestine
- Al Jadidah, town in Saudi Arabia
- Al-Jdayde (Jdeideh Quarter), a historic neighbourhood in Aleppo
- Al-Judaydah, Salamiyah, town in Syria
- Al-Judaydah, Mahardah, town in Syria
- Al-Judaydah, Aleppo Governorate, town in Syria

=== Africa ===
- Al Jadid, Libya, town in Libya
- El Jadida, coastal city in Morocco
- Djedeida, town in Tunisia
- Medina Jedida, a delegation in Tunisia

== See also ==
- Jdeideh (disambiguation)
