= Jdeideh =

Jdeideh (Arabic: جديدة, lit. 'new'), also spelled Judaydat, Jdaideh, Jdeïdé, Jdaydeh, Jadida, may refer to the following places:

== Israel ==
- Jadeidi-Makr, a town in northern Israel

== Lebanon ==
- Jdeideh, Baalbek, a village in Baalbek District, Lebanon
- Jdeideh, Chouf, a village in Chouf District, Lebanon
- Jdeideh, Matn, a municipality and capital of the Matn District, Lebanon

== Palestine ==
- Al-Judeida (Jenin), a village in Jenin Governorate, Palestine

== Saudi Arabia ==
- Jadidah, a village in Al Madinah Province, Saudi Arabia

== Syria ==
- Jdeidat Artouz, a village in Qatana District
- Jdeidat al-Wadi, a village in Qudsaya District
- Jdeidat Yabous, a village in Qudsaya District
- Judaydat al-Khas, a village in Douma District
- Al-Judaydah, Mahardah, a village in Mahardah District
- Al-Judaydah, Salamiyah, a village in Salamiyah District

== See also ==
- Al Jadid (disambiguation)
