= Mahdavi Damghani =

Mahdavi Damghani (Persian: مهدوی دامغانی) is an Iranian surname. Notable people with the surname include:

- Ahmad Mahdavi Damghani (1926–2022), Iranian scholar and university professor
- Abdolmajid Mahdavi Damghani, Iranian agroecologist
