= Johor–Jambi wars =

17th centuries conflict in Sumatera

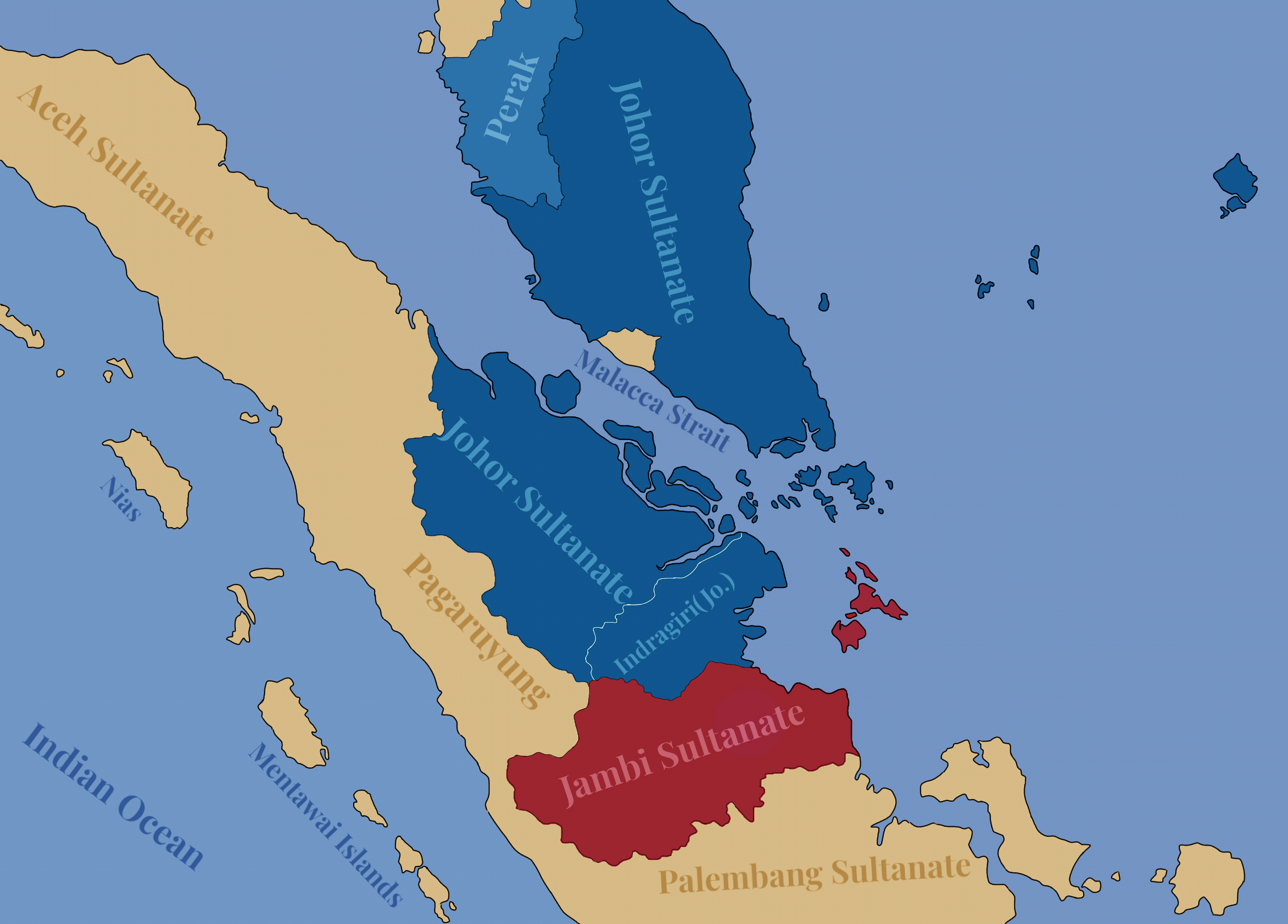
- Map of the Jambi Sultanate and Johor Sultanate
Date	1666–1681
Location	Jambi and Johor
Result	See Results: (First war, 1667): Johorean victory; Jambi suffered heavy losses.; Kuala Tungkal was captured by Johorean forces; Second war, 1673): Jambi victory; Destruction of Johor Lama; Batu Sawar got sacked by Jambi forces; Recapture of Kuala Tungkal; (Third war, 1677–1679): Johorean victory; Kuala Jambi burned by the Johorean fleets; (Fourth war, 1680–1681): Jambi victory
Territorial changes	status quo ante bellum

Belligerents
Johor Sultanate; Palembang Sultanate; Bugis–Makassar refugees	Jambi Sultanate; Portuguese Empire; Dutch East India Company (Note: (after 1673))

Commanders and leaders
Tun Abdul Jamil; Abdul Jalil Shah III; Ibrahim Shah; Datuk Bendahara (POW); Daeng Mangika †	Abdul Mahyi Sri Ingologo; Keda Abdul Kohar; Balthasar Bort

Casualties and losses
Heavy; 3,500 captured (1673)	Heavy

Johor–Jambi wars were a series of conflicts between the Jambi Sultanate and the Johor Sultanate after the fall of Portuguese Malacca and the decline of Aceh Sultanate, marked by the expansion of the influence of Johor Sultanate which endangered the position of the Jambi Sultanate. The war ended in the Jambi recapture of Kuala Tungkal and Indragiri, and the destruction of many Johor and Jambi cities.

== Background ==
Jambi took advantage of the Acehnese invasion of Johor to seize Tungkal, a disputed district on the border with Johor. Despite a 1629 Johorese attempt to seek its return, Tungkal remained under Jambian sovereignty until a pro-Johorese rebellion forced them out in 1655. Eventually, it was decided that Jambi and Johor should settle their disagreements through marriage. In 1659, the Raja Muda of Johor, Raja Ibrahim, who himself was the son of a Jambi princess and a previous sultan, was married to the daughter of the Jambi sultan. Their marriage would be a happy one. During his year-long stay in Jambi, he encouraged the Sultan to break from Mataram's overlordship, which would allow Johor and Jambi to come to a long-term peace arrangement. Eventually, Jambi did break away from Mataram's overlordship in 1663–64.

The Sultan of Johor, Abdul Jalil, became distrustful of Raja Ibrahim and the Jambi elite. He sent a fleet which extradited Raja Ibrahim from Jambi in September 1660. He feared Raja Ibrahim as a potential threat to his position, who could possibly be supported by the combined forces of Jambi and Mataram, and sought Dutch assistance if such a conflict ever arose. This suspicion was likely fueled by the Laksamana Tun Abdul Jamil of Johor, a close confidant of the Sultan, who stood to directly benefit from the conflict.

== First Johor–Jambi war ==
In May 1665, a Jambian embassy demanded that Raja Ibrahim be allowed to return to his bride, or obtain a divorce. In 1666, conflict broke out between Jambi and the Palembang Sultanate.

Raja Ibrahim came to Jambi's assistance and gathered his forces to attack Palembang. Raja Ibrahim and Jambi's fleets, however, got into a disagreement near Lingga. A battle broke out between the two sides, which ignited the conflict. The Dutch tried to mediate between the two sides; however they were unable to come to an agreement.

The war would be marked by Jambian and Johorese attempts to control the seas, "marked by an occasional show of force by either side against the other's capital". Although Johorese and Jambian forces would sometimes engage in pitched battles, the main aspects of the war were the daily attacks on shipping by pirates on both sides. As Johor and Jambi were both trading entrepots, and became prominent due to their ability to keep neighboring waters safe, these piratical activities were far more detrimental than any show of force made by the other side. In essence, the goal was to cut the other off from port revenues and eliminate their position as trade hubs by attacking any shipping in the nearby waters (including neutral parties), and decreasing their prestige.

In May 1667, a Johorese fleet destroyed the fishing huts and orchards at the mouth of the Jambi River, and later destroyed huts and a Dutch warehouse in Jambi. In August 1669, they again made a show of force at the mouth of the Jambi river, threatening future assaults.

The Dutch fruitlessly tried to broker agreements between the two sides, as the conflict decreased their revenue from trade. In August 1670, Jambian forces raided Indragiri and Tungkal, taking 917 slaves in the process. The Johorese responded to this attack by burning kampongs and inflicting a defeat on Jambi downriver in January 1671.

== Second Johor–Jambi war ==
Groups of Orang Laut, led by Sekam, deserted Johor and assisted the Jambians in attacking Johorese shipping. Abdul Jalil, threatened by Sekam, demanded his extradition to Johor. As the Dutch were allies of both Johor and Jambi, they desperately wanted to seek a peace arrangement. During the next round of peace negotiations, Abdul Jalil demanded that Jambi send envoys to Johor to explain themselves, in effect seeking Jambi's submission. Jambi was insulted, and attacks on both sides continued.

On April 4, 1673, while the Pangeran Ratu was away in Palembang preparing for a marriage between a Palembang princess and his son, Pangeran Dipati Anom, Anom led a surprise attack on Johor's capital. The city was burned and depopulated, with its population and many of Johor's elites fleeing to the jungle. The Bendahara of Johor was captured and taken back to Jambi as a war prize, along with other Johorese and some foreign merchants. Jambi also took advantage of the destruction to attack Rokan, Bengkalis, and Indragiri (although Indragiri held its own).

=== Interventions of the Bugis and Makassar ===
Johor quickly recovered, with the Laksamana of Johor acting as a main rallying point for resistance. In late 1673, the Laksamana's forces inflicted a resounding defeat on Jambi. By 1674, Jambi was soon forced on the defensive, dealing with repeated Johorese assaults and with few allies able to assist them. As a result, Jambi soon turned to Makassarese refugees to aid them in the conflict.

With the defeat of the Gowa Sultanate by the Dutch in 1669 Makassar War, many royal Makassarese refugees fled across the archipelago and into Jambi and Palembang. This inflow of refugees increased, as Arung Palakka's rule become oppressive and very intrusive in the politics of the local kingdoms. The Jambi royal family had links with southern Sulawesi, as the ruler of Jambi, Anom Ingalaga, had a Makassarese wife, Karaeng Fatimah. His mother was also from Makassar.

Sultan Ingalaga honored the Makassarese and gave their leader, a sister of Karaeng Fatimah, Daeng Mangika, the title of Pangeran Sutadilaga. The Makassarese would be equals to the Jambi ruler and would not be governed by Jambian law. However, this arrangement was inherently unstable and was bound to collapse.

== Third Johor–Jambi war ==
The continual flow of Makassarese and Buginese to Daeng Mangika from other regions of the archipelago, such as in Java after the Trunajaya rebellion and South Sulawesi after the Makassar War, made the ruler of Jambi feel threatened and worsened relations between the two.

In May 1679, the Johorese launched an attack on Jambi with 300 ships. During the Johorese invasion, Daeng Mangika deserted Sultan Ingalaga, claiming that he did not fulfill the arrangement and treated him more like a governor than a ruler. With the assistance of Daeng Mangika and 300 Makassarese soldiers, they broke the Jambian blockade of the river, leaving Jambi's capital exposed. The Pangeran Dipati Anom was forced to pay the Laksamana 10,000 rijksaalders, two metal cannons, and compensate Johor by returning the gold and people taken from Jambian raids. Jambi was also forced to send two noble hostages to ensure the continued payment of these reparations.

== Fourth Johor–Jambi war ==
The Jambi Sultanate prepared for retaliation with the support of the Dutch East India Company (VOC). Johor was receiving some support and weapon supplies from Palembang and the Makassarese, including Daeng Mangika. These forces besieged the Jambi Sultanate but Jambi unexpectedly countered the Johor-Palembang-Bugis attacks and recaptured Kuala Tungkal and Indragiri. Daeng Mangika was killed in action, ending Makassarese attempts to form a permanent base in the region.

== Aftermath ==
The conflict between Jambi and Johor caused Jambi to lose its position as a major pepper-producing port and go on the decline. In 1688, Sultan Ingalaga would be arrested and deposed by the VOC. This act split Jambi in two: Lower Jambi based in Tanah Pilih, ruled by Kiai Gede and supported by the VOC, and Upper Jambi, ruled by Pangeran Pringgabaya, under the influence of the ruler of Pagaruyung and supported by the highlanders. In 1708, an arrangement was made that Kiai Gede would relinquish his authority and cede his position to Pringgabaya, which reunified Jambi. However, the sultanate had become extremely weakened with the decline of trade.

Johor was left in a weakened position as the Bugis refused to go home, and the Minangkabaus of Sumatra had started to assert their influence.

== Citations ==
- Riska, Khairunnisa (2 December 2022). "Kondisi Ekonomi Jambi Pada Perang Johor Jambi (1667-1681)". Universitas Jambi (in Indonesian).
- Muhammad, Rizky (2 November 2024). "Melihat Konflik Johor-Jambi Dari Sudut Pandang Tungkal". Joshts.id (in Indonesian).
- Arif, Rahim (2 June 2015). "Perang Jambi-Johor (1667-1679) Sebagai Sejarah Sosial". Universitas Batanghari Jambi (in Indonesian).
- Leonard, Andaya (1971). The Kingdom of Johor 1641-1678. University of Michigan.
