= Ataf =

Ataf or ATAF may refer to:

- African Tax Administration Forum, an organization for coöperation among African tax authorities
- Allied Tactical Air Force, former NATO military formations under Allied Air Forces Central Europe (AAFCE)
  - Second Allied Tactical Air Force (2 ATAF, 1958–1993)
  - Fourth Allied Tactical Air Force (4 ATAF, 1951–1993)
- Ataf Khawaja (born 1974), Danish rap artist of Pakistani origin

== See also ==
- Atif
