= Comparative navy officer ranks of the Commonwealth =

Rank comparison chart of naval forces of Commonwealth of Nations states.

Most of the 52 Commonwealth nations have their beginnings in British Empire and have shared naval traditions. By comparison, Gabon and Togo are French colonies, Mozambique is a former Portuguese colony while Rwanda is a German and later, Belgian colony. Even after some had achieved a degree of independent government from the UK, their naval protection was still British; the Royal New Zealand Navy did not exist separately until 1941.

== Officers ==
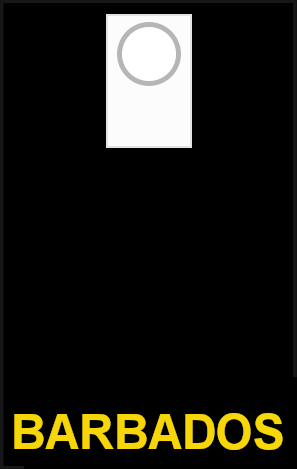
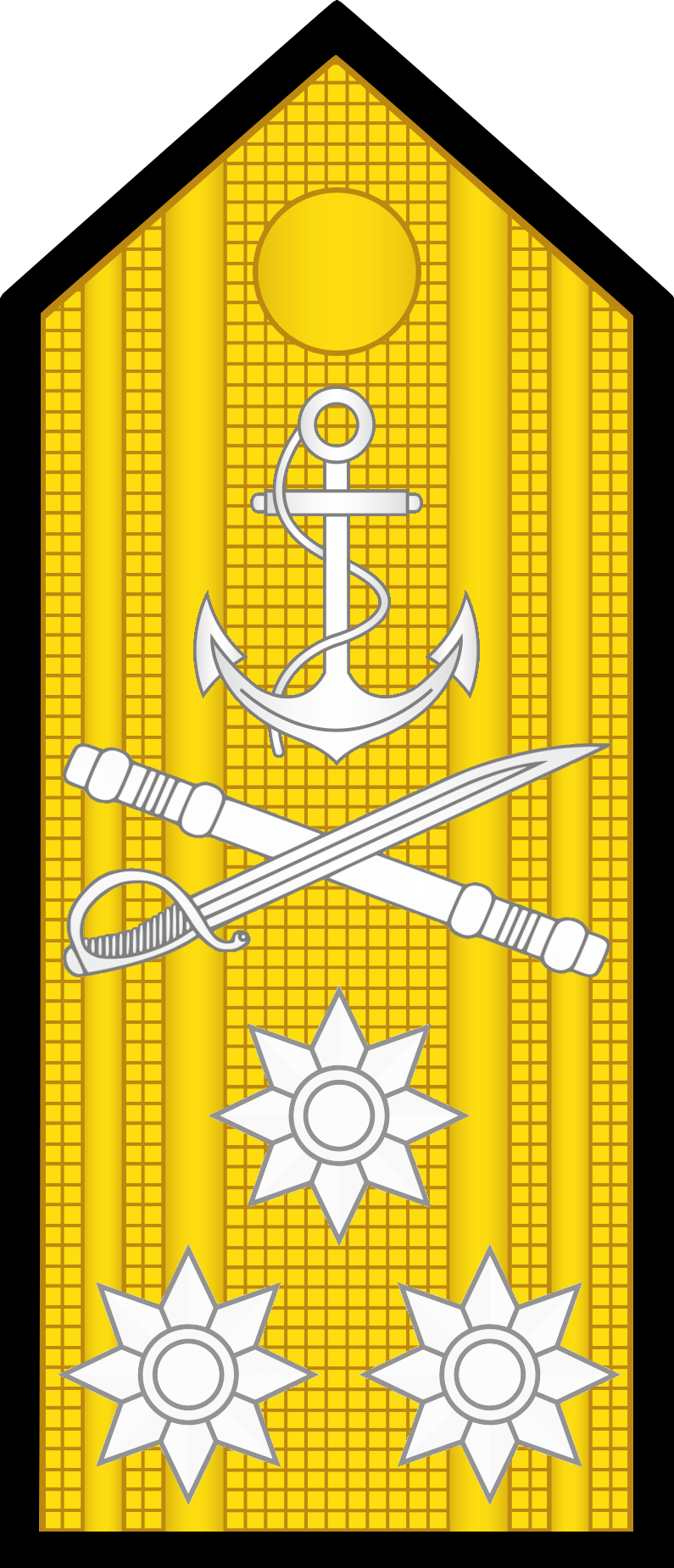
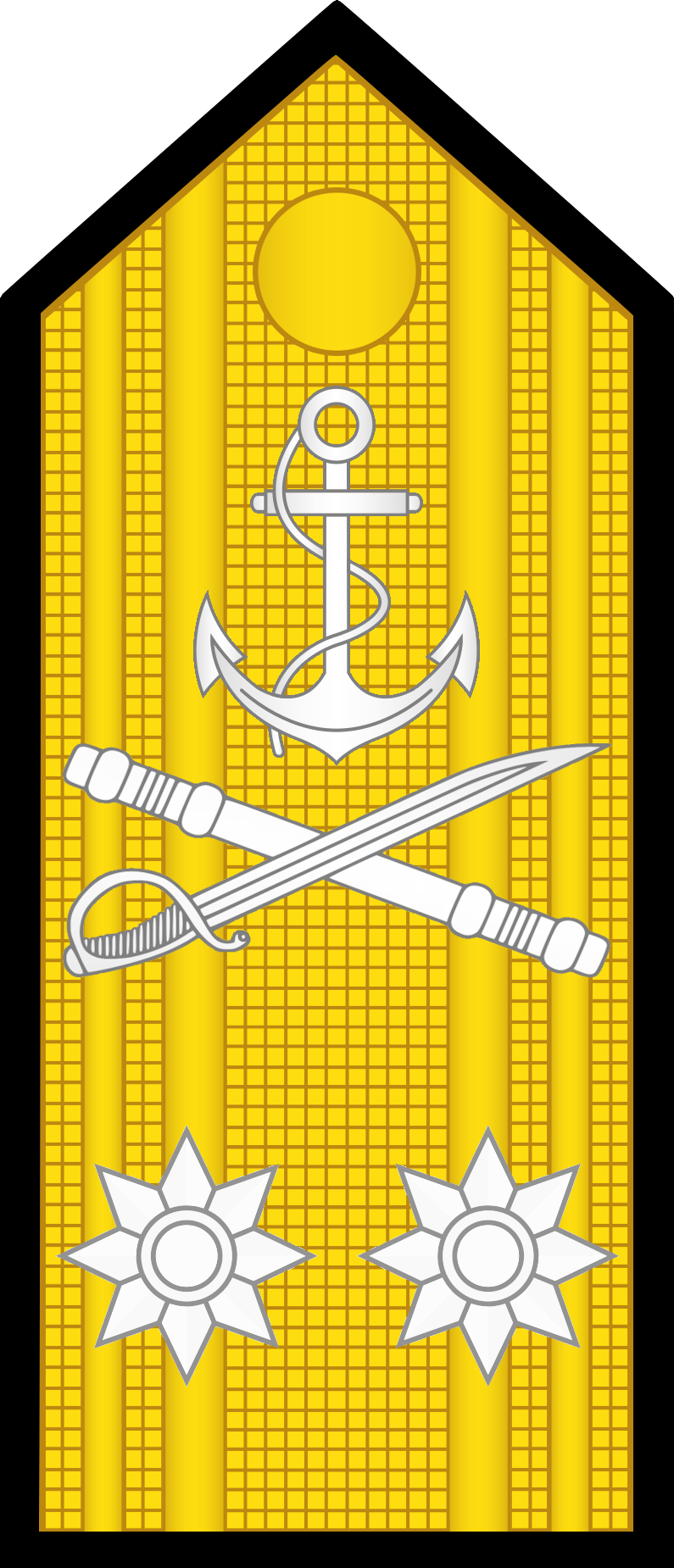
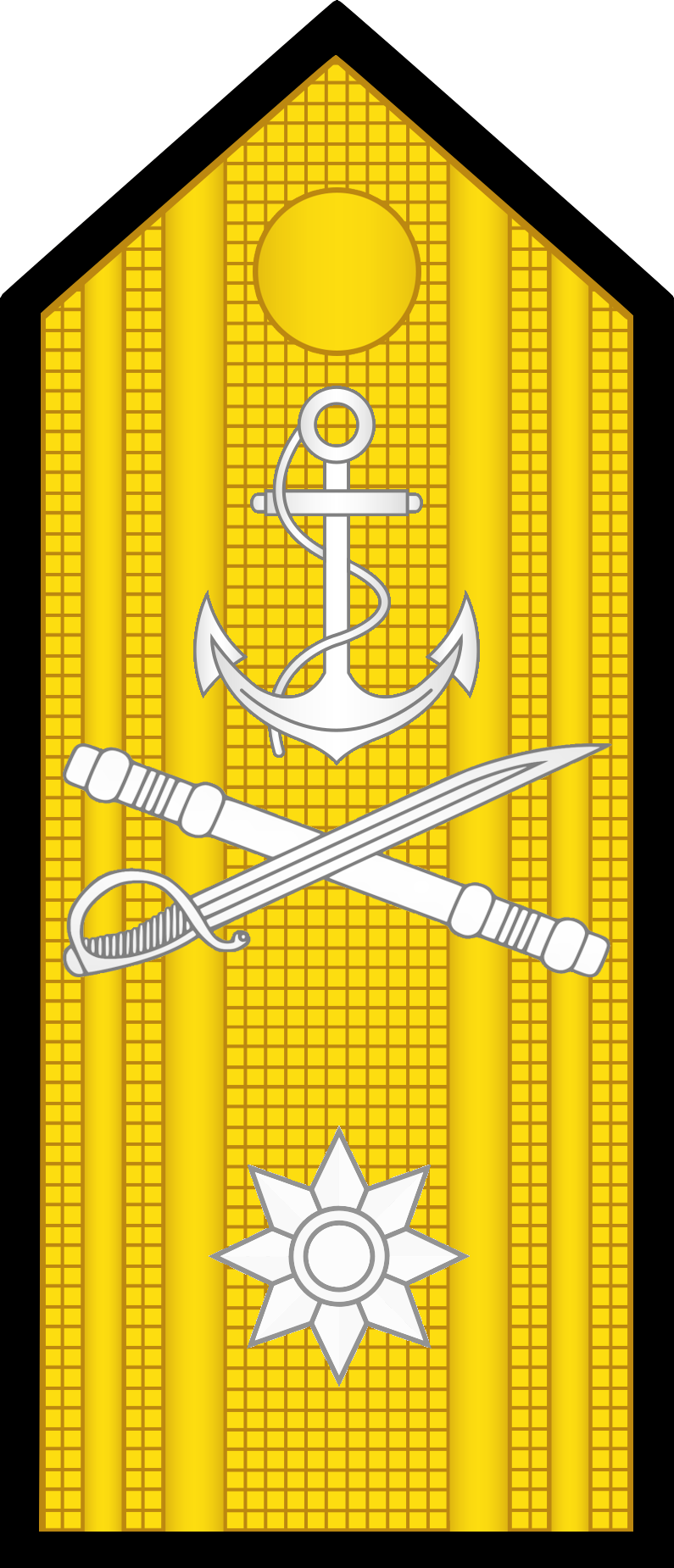
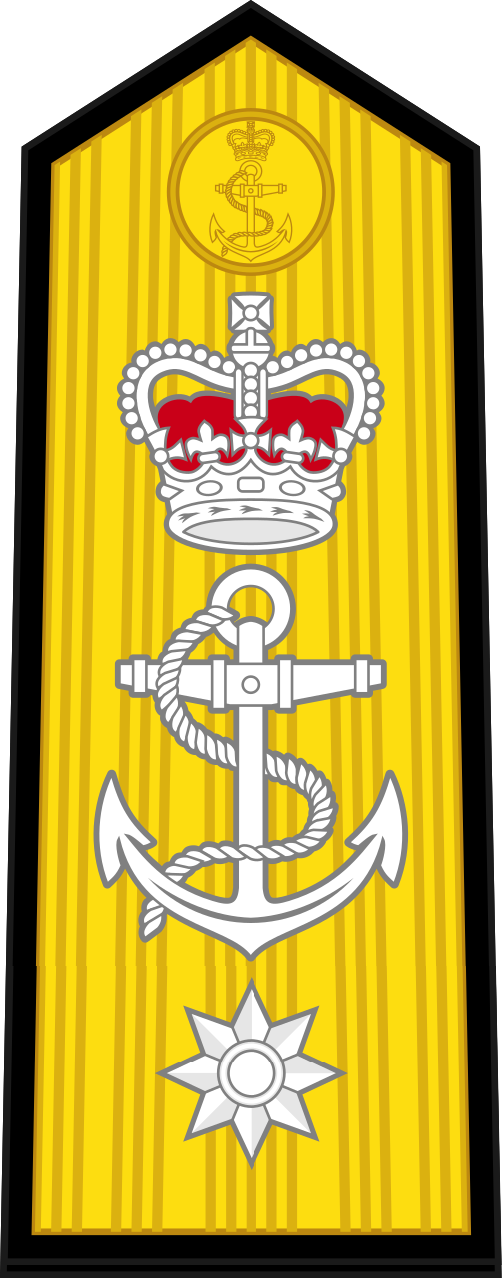
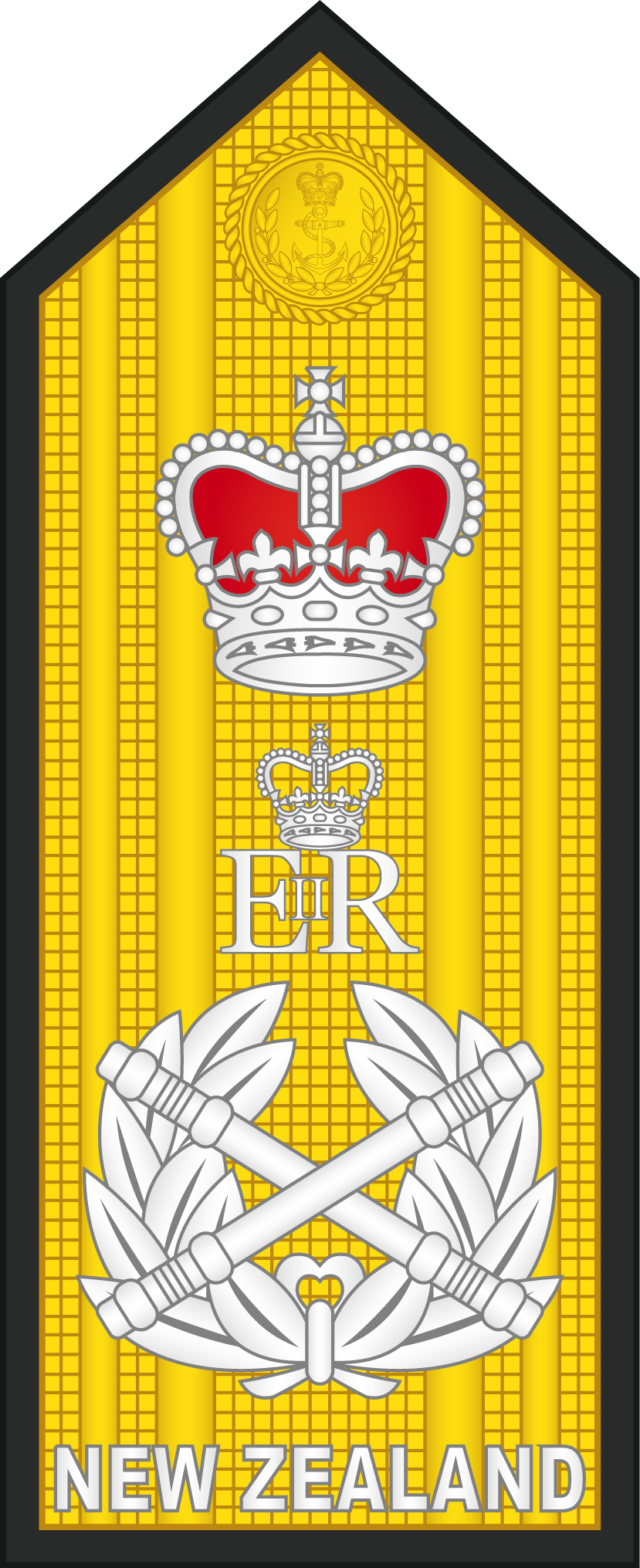
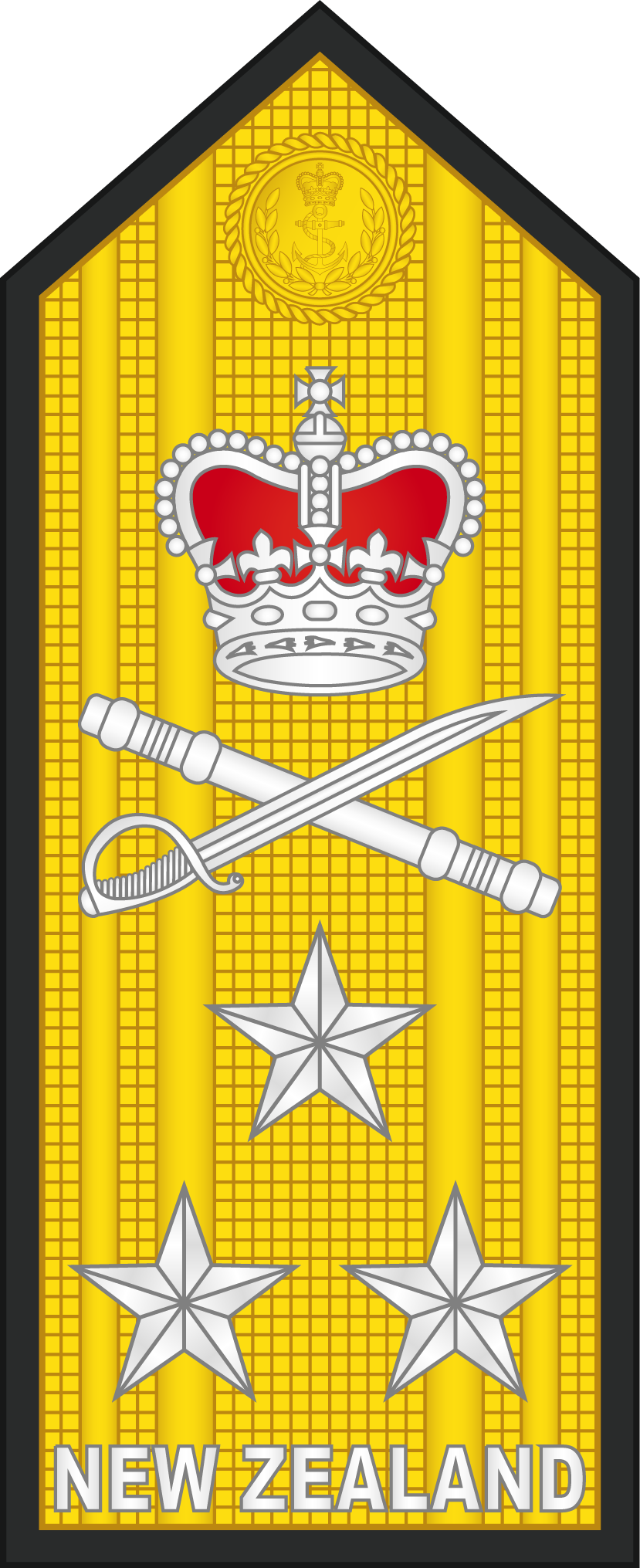
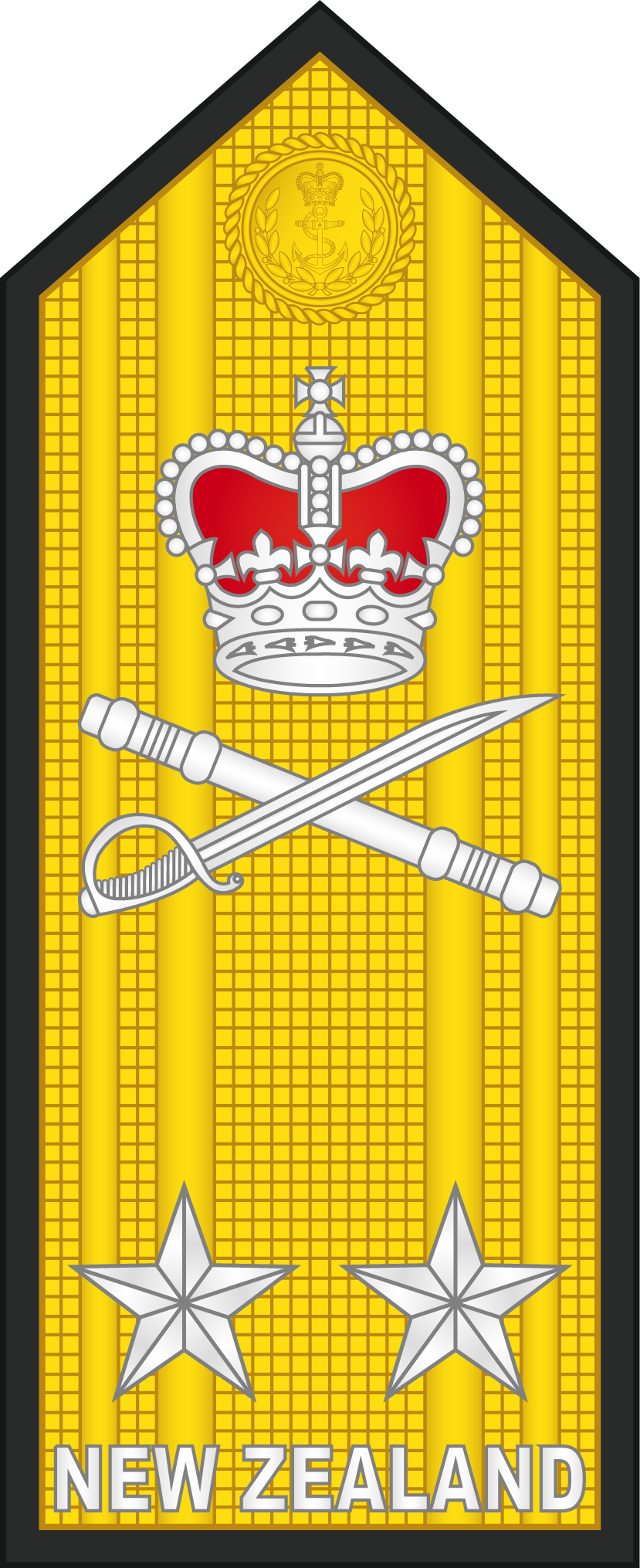
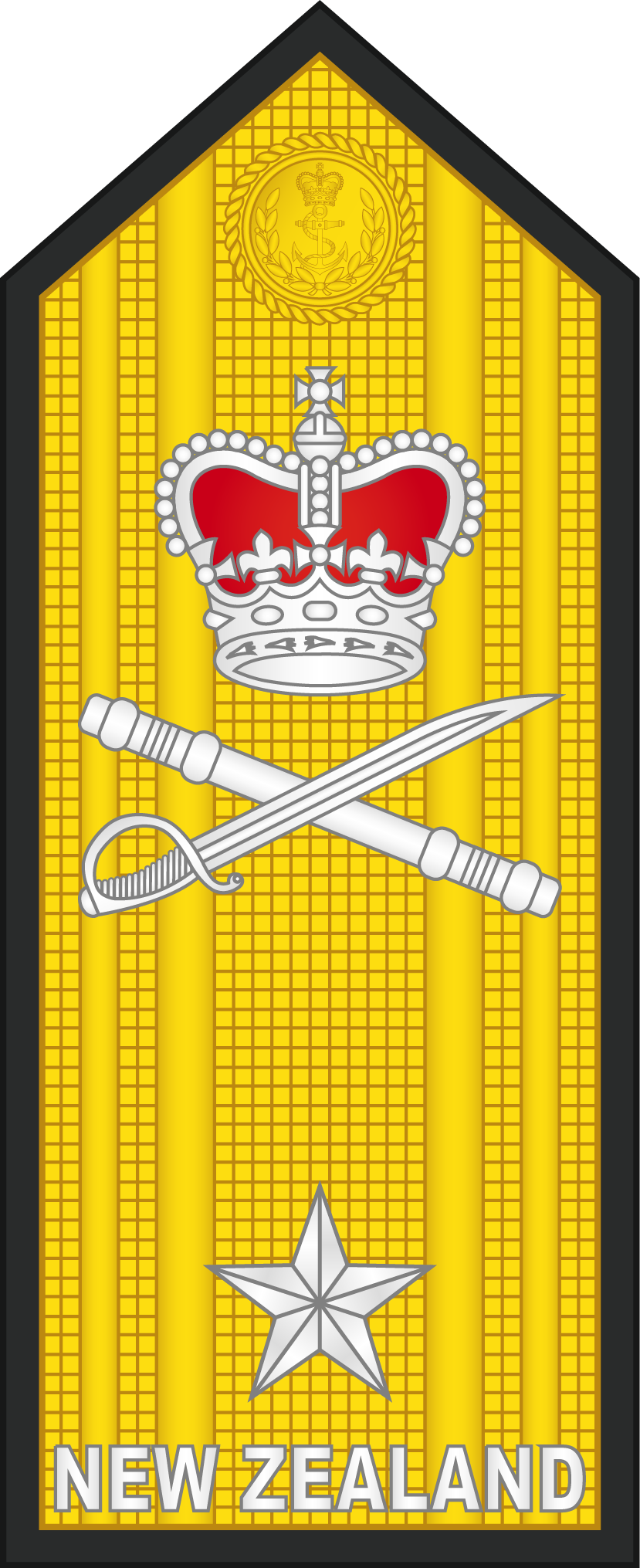
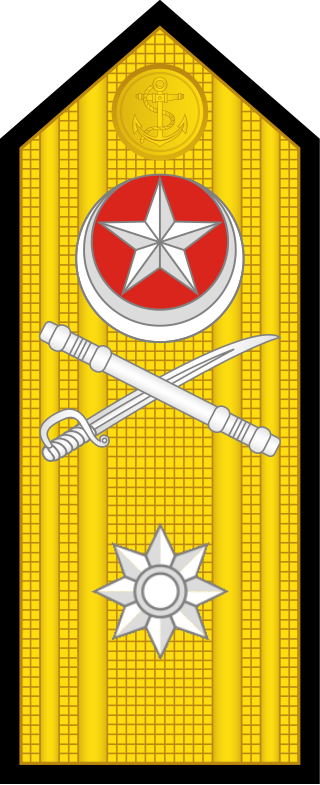
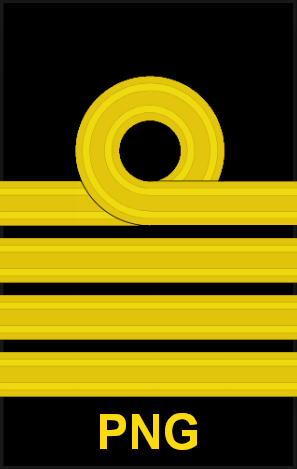
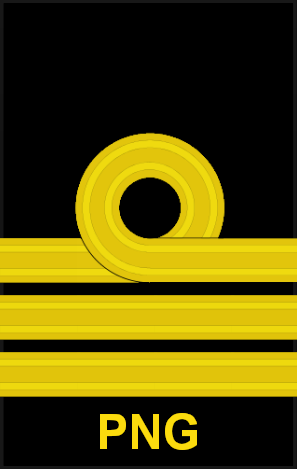
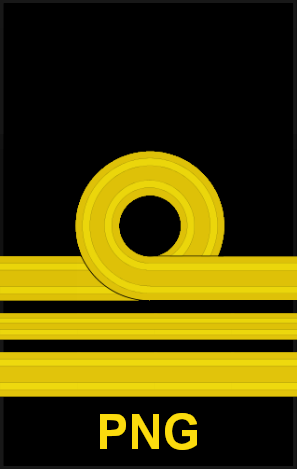
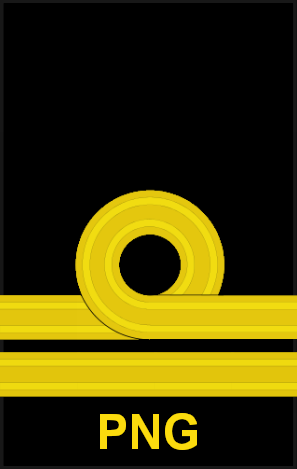
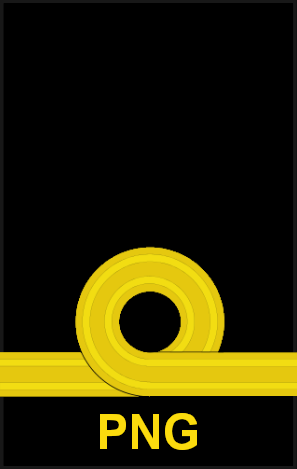
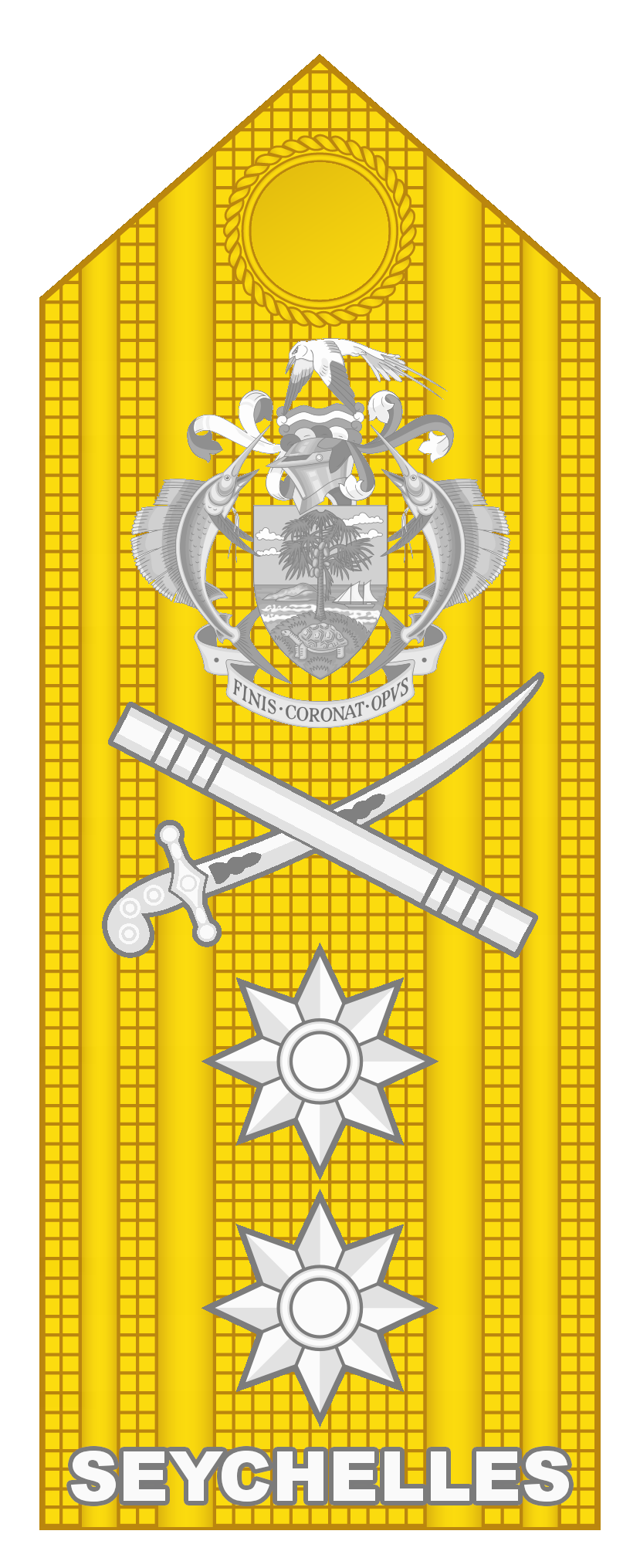
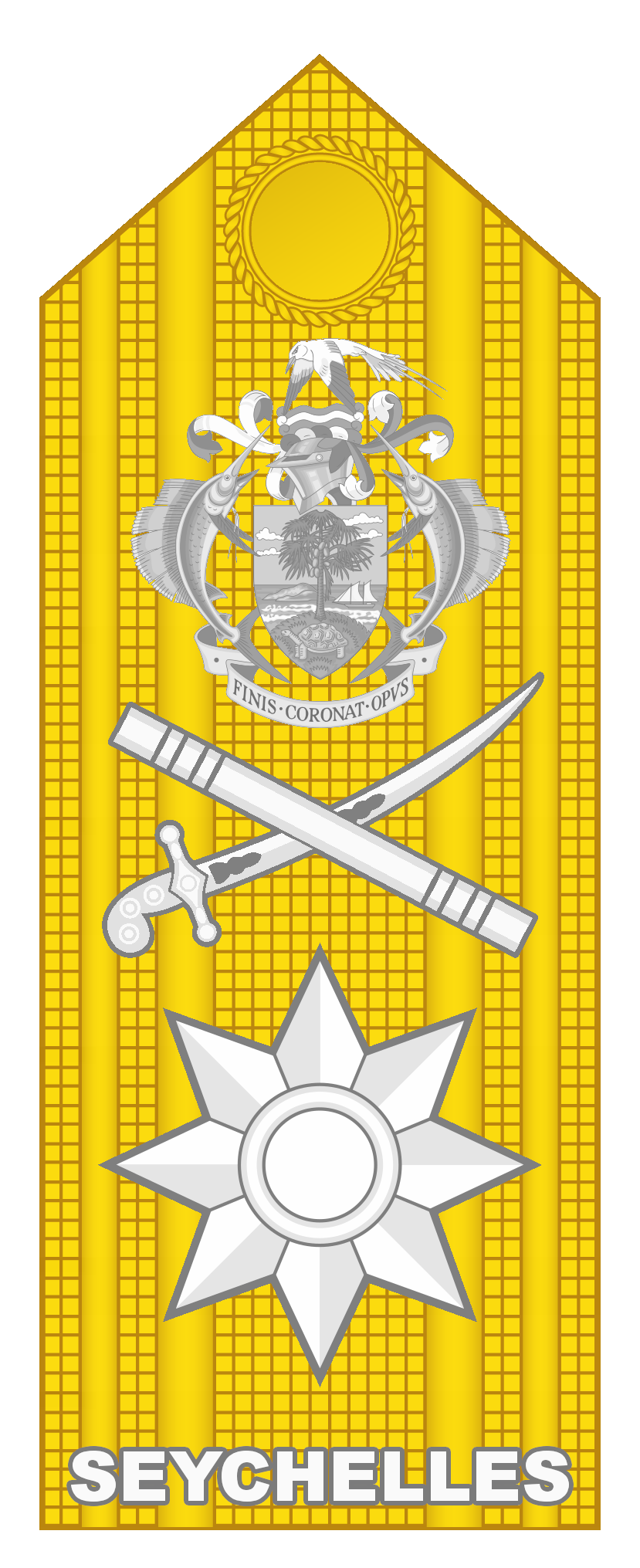
Rank group	General / flag officers					Senior officers				Junior officers
Antigua and Barbuda Coast Guard
Antigua and Barbuda Coast Guard						Captain	Commander		Lieutenant commander	Lieutenant		Lieutenant (junior grade)		Sub-lieutenant
Royal Australian Navy
Royal Australian Navy	Admiral of the fleet	Admiral	Vice admiral	Rear admiral	Commodore	Captain	Commander		Lieutenant commander	Lieutenant		Sub lieutenant		Acting sub lieutenant
Royal Bahamas Defence Force
Royal Bahamas Defence Force					Commodore	Captain	Senior commander	Commander	Lieutenant commander	Senior lieutenant	Lieutenant	Sub-lieutenant		Acting sub-lieutenant
Bangladesh Navy
Bangladesh Navy		এ্যাডমিরাল; Aeḍmirāl	ভাইস এ্যাডমিরাল; Bhā'is aeḍamirāl	রিয়ার এ্যাডমিরাল; Riẏār aeḍamirāl	কমোডোর; Kômōḍōr	ক্যাপ্টেন; Kaepṭēn	কমান্ডার; Kômānḍār		লেফটেন্যান্ট কমান্ডার; Lēphṭēnānṭ kômānḍār	লেফটেন্যান্ট; Lēphṭēnānṭ		সাব-লেফটেন্যান্ট; Sāb-lēphṭēnānṭ	এ্যাক্টিং সাব-লেফটেন্যান্ট; Ēyākṭiṁ sāb-lēphṭēn'yānṭ	মিডশিপম্যান; Miḍśipmaen
Barbados Coast Guard
Barbados Coast Guard					Commodore		Commander		Lieutenant commander	Lieutenant		Sub lieutenant		Midshipman
Belize Coast Guard
Belize Coast Guard				Rear admiral	Rear admiral (lower half)	Captain	Commander		Lieutenant commander	Lieutenant		Lieutenant (junior grade)		Ensign
Botswana	No navy
Royal Brunei Navy
Royal Brunei Navy	Laksamana armada	Laksamana	Laksamana madya	Laksamana muda	Laksamana pertama	Kepten	Komander		Leftenan komander	Leftenan		Leftenan madya		Leftenan muda
Cameroon Navy
Cameroon Navy		Amiral d'escadre	Vice-amiral d'escadre	Vice-amiral	Contre-amiral	Capitaine de vaisseau	Capitaine de frégate		Capitaine de corvette	Lieutenant de vaisseau		Enseigne de vaisseau de 1^{re} classe		Enseigne de vaisseau de 2^{e} classe
Royal Canadian Navy
Royal Canadian Navy		Admiral	Vice-admiral	Rear-admiral	Commodore	Captain (N)	Commander		Lieutenant-commander	Lieutenant (N)		Sub-lieutenant		Acting sub-lieutenant
Royal Canadian Navy		Amiral(e)	Vice-amiral(e)	Contre-amiral(e)	Commodore	Capitaine de vaisseau	Capitaine de frégate		Capitaine de corvette	Lieutenant(e) de vaisseau		Enseigne de vaisseau de 1^{re} classe		Enseigne de vaisseau de 2^{e} classe
Cyprus Navy
Cyprus Navy			Αντιναύαρχος; Antinavarchos	Υποναύαρχος; Yponavarchos	Αρχιπλοίαρχος; Archiploiarchos	Πλοίαρχος; Ploiarchos	Αντιπλοίαρχος; Antiploiarchos		Πλωτάρχης; Plotarchis	Υποπλοίαρχος; Ypoploiarchos		Ανθυποπλοίαρχος; Anthypoploiarchos		Σημαιοφόρος; Simaioforos
Dominica	No navy
Eswatini	No navy
Republic of Fiji Navy
Republic of Fiji Navy				Rear admiral	Commodore	Captain	Commander		Lieutenant commander	Lieutenant		Sub-Lieutenant		Ensign
Gabonese Navy
Gabonese Navy		Amiral	Vice-amiral d'escadre	Vice-amiral	Contre-amiral	Capitaine de vaisseau	Capitaine de frégate		Capitaine de corvette	Lieutenant de vaisseau		Enseigne de vaisseau de 1^{re} classe		Enseigne de vaisseau de 2^{e} classe
Ghana Navy
Ghana Navy		Admiral	Vice admiral	Rear admiral	Commodore	Captain	Commander		Lieutenant commander	Lieutenant		Sub lieutenant
Grenada	No navy
Guyana Coast Guard
Guyana Coast Guard				Rear admiral	Commodore	Captain	Commander		Lieutenant commander	Lieutenant		Lieutenant junior grade		Sub-lieutenant
Indian Navy
Indian Navy		Admiral एडमिरल	Vice admiral वाइस एडमिरल	Rear admiral रियर एडमिरल	Commodore कमोडोर	Captain कैप्टन	Commander कमांडर		Lieutenant commander लेफ़्टिनेंट कमांडर	Lieutenant लेफ्टिनेंट		Sub-lieutenant सब लेफ्टिनेंट		Midshipman मिडशिपमैन
Rank group	General / flag officers					Senior officers				Junior officers
Jamaican Coast Guard
Jamaican Coast Guard			Vice admiral	Rear admiral	Commodore	Captain	Commander		Lieutenant commander	Lieutenant		Lieutenant (junior grade)		Sub-lieutenant
Kenya Navy
Kenya Navy		General	Lieutenant general	Major general	Brigadier	Colonel	Lieutenant colonel		Major	Captain		Lieutenant		Second lieutenant
Kiribati	No navy
Lesotho	No navy
Royal Malaysian Navy
Royal Malaysian Navy	Laksamana armada	Laksamana	Laksamana madya	Laksamana muda	Laksamana pertama	Kepten	Komander		Leftenan komander	Leftenan		Leftenan madya		Leftenan muda
Maritime Squadron of Malta
Maritime Squadron of Malta					Brigadier; Brigadier	Colonel; Kurunell	Lieutenant colonel Logutenent kurunell		Major; Maġġur	Captain; Kaptan		Lieutenant; Logutenent		Second lieutenant Sekond logutenent
Mauritius	No navy
Mozambique Naval Command
Mozambique Naval Command		Almirante	Vice-almirante	Contra-almirante		Capitão de mar e guerra	Capitão de fragata		Capitão-tenente	Primeiro-tenente		Segundo-tenente		Guarda-marinha
Namibian Navy
Namibian Navy		Admiral	Vice admiral	Rear admiral	Rear admiral junior grade	Captain	Commander		Lieutenant commander	Lieutenant		Lieutenant junior grade		Ensign
Namibian Marine Corps
Namibian Marine Corps						Marine Commandant	Commander		Lieutenant commander	Lieutenant		Lieutenant (junior grade)		Ensign
Nauru	No navy
Royal New Zealand Navy
Royal New Zealand Navy	Admiral of the fleet		Vice admiral	Rear admiral	Commodore	Captain	Commander		Lieutenant commander	Lieutenant		Sub lieutenant		Ensign
Nigerian Navy
Nigerian Navy	Admiral of the Fleet	Admiral	Vice admiral	Rear admiral	Commodore	Captain	Commander		Lieutenant commander	Lieutenant		Sub-Lieutenant		Midshipman
Pakistan Navy
Pakistan Navy		Admiral ایڈمرل	Vice admiral وائس ایڈمرل	Rear admiral بحریہ کا امیر	Commodore کموڈور	Captain کپتان	Commander کمانڈر		Lieutenant commander لیفٹیننٹ کمانڈر	Lieutenant لیفٹیننٹ		Sub-lieutenant سب لیفٹیننٹ		Midshipman مڈ شپ مین
Papua New Guinea Maritime Element
Papua New Guinea Maritime Element				Rear Admiral	Commodore	Captain	Commander		Lieutenant; Commander	Lieutenant		Sub; Lieutenant
Rwanda	No navy
Saint Kitts and Nevis Coast Guard
Saint Kitts and Nevis Coast Guard							Commander		Lieutenant Commander	Lieutenant		Sub-Lieutenant		Midshipman
Saint Lucia	No navy
Rank group	General / flag officers					Senior officers				Junior officers
Saint Vincent and the Grenadines	No navy
Samoa	No navy
Seychelles Coast Guard
Seychelles Coast Guard				Major general (Note: Introduced December 2024)	Brigadier general	Colonel	Lieutenant colonel		Major	Captain		Lieutenant		Second lieutenant
Sierra Leone Navy
Sierra Leone Navy				Rear admiral	Commodore	Captain	Commander		Lieutenant commander	Lieutenant		Lieutenant (junior grade)		Sub-Lieutenant
Republic of Singapore Navy		No insignia yet
Republic of Singapore Navy		Admiral	Vice admiral	Rear admiral	Rear admiral (junior grade)	Colonel	Senior lieutenant colonel	Lieutenant colonel	Major	Captain		Lieutenant		Second lieutenant
Solomon Islands	No navy
South African Navy
South African Navy		Admiral	Vice admiral	Rear admiral	Rear admiral (junior grade)	Captain	Commander		Lieutenant commander	Lieutenant		Sub lieutenant		Ensign
Sri Lanka Navy
Sri Lanka Navy	Admiral of the fleet	Admiral	Vice admiral	Rear admiral	Commodore	Captain	Commander		Lieutenant commander	Lieutenant		Sub-lieutenant		Midshipman
(Eswatini) Swaziland	No navy
Tanzania Naval Command
Tanzania Naval Command			Vice admiral	Rear admiral	Commodore	Captain	Commander		Lieutenant commander	Lieutenant		Sub lieutenant		Ensign
Togolese Navy
Togolese Navy				Vice-amiral	Contre-amiral	Capitaine de vaisseau	Capitaine de frégate		Capitaine de corvette	Lieutenant de vaisseau		Enseigne de vaisseau de 1^{re} classe		Enseigne de vaisseau de 2^{e} classe
Tongan Navy
Tongan Navy					Commodore	Captain	Commander		Lieutenant commander	Lieutenant		Sub lieutenant		Midshipman
Trinidad and Tobago Coast Guard
Trinidad and Tobago Coast Guard				Rear admiral	Commodore	Captain	Commander		Lieutenant commander	Lieutenant		Sub-lieutenant		Acting sub-lieutenant
Tuvalu	No navy
Uganda	No navy
Royal Navy
Royal Navy	Admiral of the Fleet	Admiral	Vice admiral	Rear admiral	Commodore	Captain	Commander		Lieutenant commander	Lieutenant		Sub lieutenant		Midshipman
Royal Marines
Royal Marines		General	Lieutenant-general	Major-general	Brigadier	Colonel	Lieutenant colonel		Major	Captain		Lieutenant		Second lieutenant
Vanuatu Maritime Wing
Vanuatu Maritime Wing							Commander; Komanda		Lieutenant commander Lietnen Komanda	Lieutenant; Lietnen		Sub lieutenant Sab-Lietnen
Zambia	No navy
Rank group	General / flag officers					Senior officers				Junior officers

== See also ==
- Comparative navy officer ranks of the Americas
- Ranks and insignia of NATO navies' officers
