= Abdul Majid Thuneibat =

Jordanian politician (1945–2022)

Member of the Senate of Jordan
- In office 29 November 2007 – 13 January 2012

Personal details
- Born: 5 October 1945 Al-Judayyda, Emirate of Transjordan
- Died: 16 November 2022 (aged 77)
- Party: Society of the Muslim Brothers in Jordan
- Education: Damascus University
- Occupation: Lawyer

Abdul Majid Thuneibat (Arabic: عبد المجيد ذنيبات; 5 October 1945 – 16 November 2022) was a Jordanian lawyer and politician. A member of the Society of the Muslim Brothers in Jordan, he served in the Senate from 2007 to 2012.

Thuneibat died on 16 November 2022, at the age of 77.
