= Atif =

- Pronunciation: Arabic: [ʕaːtˤɪf] Egyptian Arabic: [ʕɑːtˤef]
- Gender: Male
- Language: Arabic

Origin
- Meaning: "Kind one"

Other names
- Variant form: Aatif

Atif (also spelled Atef or Atiph, Arabic: عاطف) is an Arabic masculine given name generally used in the Muslim world, it means "the kind one".

== Notable people with the given name “Atif” ==
=== Atef ===
- Atef Abu Bakr (born 1946), Palestinian politician and diplomat
- Atef Abu Saif (born 1973), Palestinian writer
- Atef Adwan (born 1950), Palestinian politician
- Atef Bseiso (1948–1992), Palestine Liberation Organization head of intelligence
- Atef Dkhili (born 1990), Tunisian footballer
- Atef Ebeid (1932–2014), Egyptian politician
- Atef Maoua (born 1981), Tunisian basketball player
- Atef Najib (born 1964/65), Syrian political security chief in the city of Daraa
- Atef Saad (born 1988), Tunisian long-distance runner
- Atef Sadat (1948–1973), Egyptian Air Force pilot
- Atef Salem (1927–2002), Egyptian film director
- Atef Sedky (1930–2005), Egyptian politician
- Atef Tarawneh (born 1954), Jordanian politician
- Atef El-Tayeb (1947–1995), Egyptian film director

=== Atif ===
- Atif Abdelmageed, Sudanese administrator
- Atif Aslam (born 1983), Pakistani singer
- Atif Ashraf (born 1980), Pakistani cricketer
- Atif Azal, known as A-Zal, New-York-based musician
- Atif Bashir (born 1985), German footballer
- Atif Butt (born 1969), Pakistani-born Danish cricketer
- Atif Butt, Pakistani esports player
- Atif Dudaković (born 1953), Bosnian army general
- Atif Jabbar (born 1990), Pakistani cricketer
- Atif Mian (born 1975), American economist
- Atif Qarni (born 1978), American teacher and politician
- Atif Rauf (born 1964), Pakistani cricketer
- Atif Sheikh (born 1991), English cricketer

=== Atıf ===
- İskilipli Mehmed Atıf Hoca (1875–1926), Turkish Imam, Islamic scholar, and author
- Atıf Yılmaz Batıbeki (1925–2006), Turkish film director, screenwriter, and film producer

== Notable people with the surname “Atif” ==
=== Atef ===
- Bahram Atef (born 1941), Iranian football manager and academic
- Emily Atef (born 1973), French-Iranian director, screenwriter and producer based in Berlin
- Mohammed Atef Al-Masri (1944–2001), Egyptian military chief of al-Qaida
- Momen Atef (born 1994), Egyptian footballer
- Salah Atef, commonly known as Rico (born 1989), Egyptian footballer

=== Atif ===
- Kamran Atif, member of Harkat-ul Mujahideen al-Alami
- Mohammad Atif Ali (born 1982), Emirati cricketer
- Parveen Atif (1935–2018), Pakistani Urdu fiction writer, short story writer, columnist, and a pioneer of women's field hockey
