= Abdul Majid Khan =

Abdul Majid Khan may refer to:

== Given name ==
- Abdul Majid Khan (detainee) (born 1953), Afghan national detained by US DoD at Bagram since 2008
- Abdul Majid Khan Tarin (1877–1939), magistrate and politician of former British India
- Md. Abdul Majid Khan (born 1954), a politician from Bangladesh
