= Tun Abdul Jamil =

Laksamana Tun Abdul Jamil Paduka Raja was a Malay warrior of the Johor Sultanate. He played a major role in trying to wrest Malacca from Portuguese control.

== Laksamana Tun Jamil and Portuguese Malacca ==
In the early 17th century, Sultan Abdullah (also known as Raja Bongsu) was the de facto ruler of Johor during the reign of Sultan Alauddin Riayat Shah III (r. 1597–1615). The Johor Sultanate made contact with the Dutch East India Company when the Dutch made several visits to Johor: Jacob Van Heemsberk in 1602, Jacob Pietersz Van Enkhuijen in 1603 and Admiral Wijb An Wijck Mei in 1604. Sultan Abdullah made a pact with the Dutch to attack the Portuguese Malacca and retake the city, putting it under Malay rule.

Laksamana Tun Abdul Jamil was chosen to lead the 1606 Johor expeditionary force against the Portuguese garrison in Malacca. The force comprised 50 war perahu and 3,000 warriors. The Dutch contributed 11 men-of-war. The Dutch admiral Cornelis Matelief de Jonge (c. 1569–1632) had under his command the ships. The ships were Oranje, Nassau, Middelburg, Witte Leeuw, Zwarte Leeuw, Mauritius, Grote Zon, Amsterdam, Kleine Zon, Erasmus and Geuniveerde Provincien.

On 18 May 1606, the Malay-Dutch force laid a siege on Malacca. A Portuguese fleet of 14 warships was sent by the Viceroy of Goa to relieve the Portuguese garrison. A naval battle was fought on 17 August. The Dutch ship Nassau was boarded by the Santa Cruz and the Nossa Senhora Conceição. After suffering losses when the Middelburg and Nassau were lost, Matelief withdrew his force to the Johor River for repairs. With the loss at sea, Tun Abdul Jamil was forced to abandon the land siege.

A second attempt was made in September of the same year. The Johor contingent was again led by Tun Abdul Jamil, while the sea battle saw a Dutch victory, this time the land siege failed, and the Johor forces withdrew.

Sultan Abdul Jalil III became sultan (with assistance from the Dutch) in 1638. In 1640, another attempt by a Johor–Dutch expeditionary force was made to capture Malacca. The Johor force consisted of 40 war perahus and 1,500 warriors, again led by Laksamana Tun Abdul Jamil. In August 1640, they successfully laid siege to Malacca, until the surrender of the garrison in January 1641.

== Johor-Jambi War ==
By 1666, Jambi became a significant economic power and wanted independence from Johor. From 1666, a series of wars erupted between Johor and Jambi. Johor's capital, Batu Sawar, was sacked by Jambi.

In 1678, Laksamana Tun Abdul Jamil persuaded his nephew Sultan Ibrahim Shah to flee from Pahang to the relative safety of Riau. Laksamana Tun Abdul Jamil then returned to Johor Lama from Siak and killed the Temenggong. In 1679 however, Laksamana Tun Abdul Jalil paid Bugis mercenaries to fight alongside Johor against Jambi and the latter was subdued.

== Consolidation of power ==
Tun Abdul Jamil was made Laksamana of Johor, with de facto powers of the Bendahara succeeding Tun Sri Lanang who went into exile in Aceh. As he grew in influence, he sidestepped many nobles. The Temenggung who opposed him was killed and he began the practice of appointing his sons to influential posts. In the end, even the Sultan was ignored. Tun Abdul Jamil was the de facto ruler when Sultan Mahmud Shah II ascended to the throne in 1685. Bendahara Tun Habib Abdul Majid reclaimed the Bendaharaship and led nobles and subjects in an uprising but he was eventually killed.

== Honours ==
- the Royal Malaysian Navy named a Laksamana Class Corvette KD Laksamana Tun Abdul Jamil, which was commissioned in July 1999
