= Battle of Duyon River =

1629 Battles In Malacca

- Part of Acehnese–Portuguese conflicts
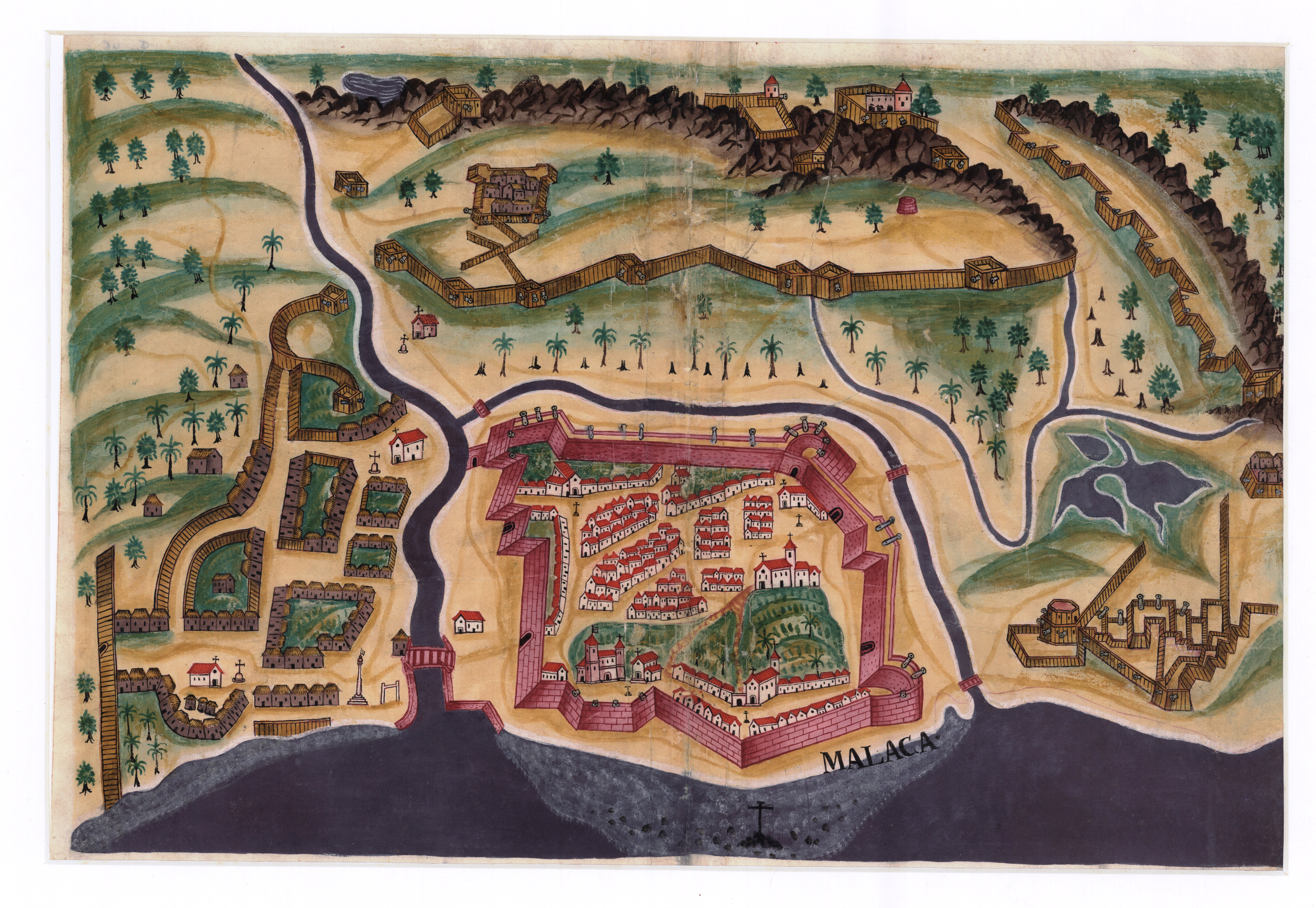
- 1635 Portuguese watercolour sketch of the Portuguese Malacca fortress
Date	June–December 1629
Location	Portuguese Malacca
Result	Portuguese victory

Belligerents
(Portugal) Portuguese Empire; Sultanate of Johor	(Aceh Sultanate) Sultanate of Aceh

Commanders and leaders
(Portugal) Nuno Álvares Botelho (Portugal) António Pinto da Fonseca; Abdul Jalil Shah III	(Aceh Sultanate) Laksamana (?) (POW) (Aceh Sultanate) Marraja †; King of Dely †

Strength
1,260 Portuguese soldiers 400 auxiliaries 4 brigantines 28 galleys 2,000 Pahang warriors 60 vessels of Pahang	236 ships 19,000–20,000 men

Casualties and losses
60 dead	All ships captured or destroyed All men killed or captured 170 heavy artillery pieces captured the Laksamana captured

The Battle of Duyon River was a naval engagement between the Portuguese forces commanded by Nuno Álvares Botelho, who is renowned in Portugal as one of the last great commanders of Portuguese India, and the forces of the Sultanate of Aceh, which were led by the Laksamana.

The relatively modest Portuguese fleet achieved an absolute victory over the Ottoman-allied Aceh in that not a single ship or man of the invading force sent to conquer Malacca returned to their country. The Sultanate of Perak, a vassal of the Sultanate of Aceh, defected to the Portuguese side after the battle.

== Background ==
The 1629 Acehnese attack on Portuguese Malacca came about in the context of growing presence of vessels of the Dutch East India Company (VOC) and the East India Company (EIC) in the Indian Ocean. Sultan Iskandar Muda of Aceh sought to capture Malacca before either the EIC or the VOC did so and replaced the Portuguese as overlords of the most important trade emporium in the Strait of Malacca.

In 1628, the Portuguese destroyed an advance Acehnese fleet at the Langat River, sent to raid their shipping. Despite this setback, Iskandar Muda proceeded with preparations for the attack on Malacca, yet this raised some doubts among his command: the admiral of the fleet, identified by the Portuguese as the Laksamana, opposed the campaign. Another experienced commander, identified in Portuguese sources as Marraja argued that the Portuguese would not only be unable to resist a strong siege but that any relief was unlikely. Iskandar Muda sided with Marraja's opinion.

The Portuguese command at Malacca suspected Acehnese preparations and sent a notable resident – Pero de Abreu – to Aceh as an ambassador to confirm a peace treaty Iskandar Muda had previously signed with the Portuguese, but Abreu was arrested and the treaty disregarded. Despite his arrest, Abreu managed to send out a message to Malacca warning of the impending attack. As a result, the Portuguese captain-general of the Southern Sea António Pinto da Fonseca and the captain of Malacca ordered the defenses of the city built up, while envoys were dispatched to Goa requesting reinforcements as well as to the Portuguese-allied Sultan of Johor, who traded extensively with the Portuguese and despised the Sultan of Aceh.

The Portuguese captain-major of the Sea of Malacca Francisco Lopes was sent to the vicinity of Aceh with a nimble force of native boats to gather intel, and he captured a vessel that was transporting the son-in-law of Iskandar Muda plus a number of other Acehnese princes, then fleeing from Iskandar Muda's tyrannical rule; they told the Portuguese everything regarding the ongoing preparations.

== The siege ==
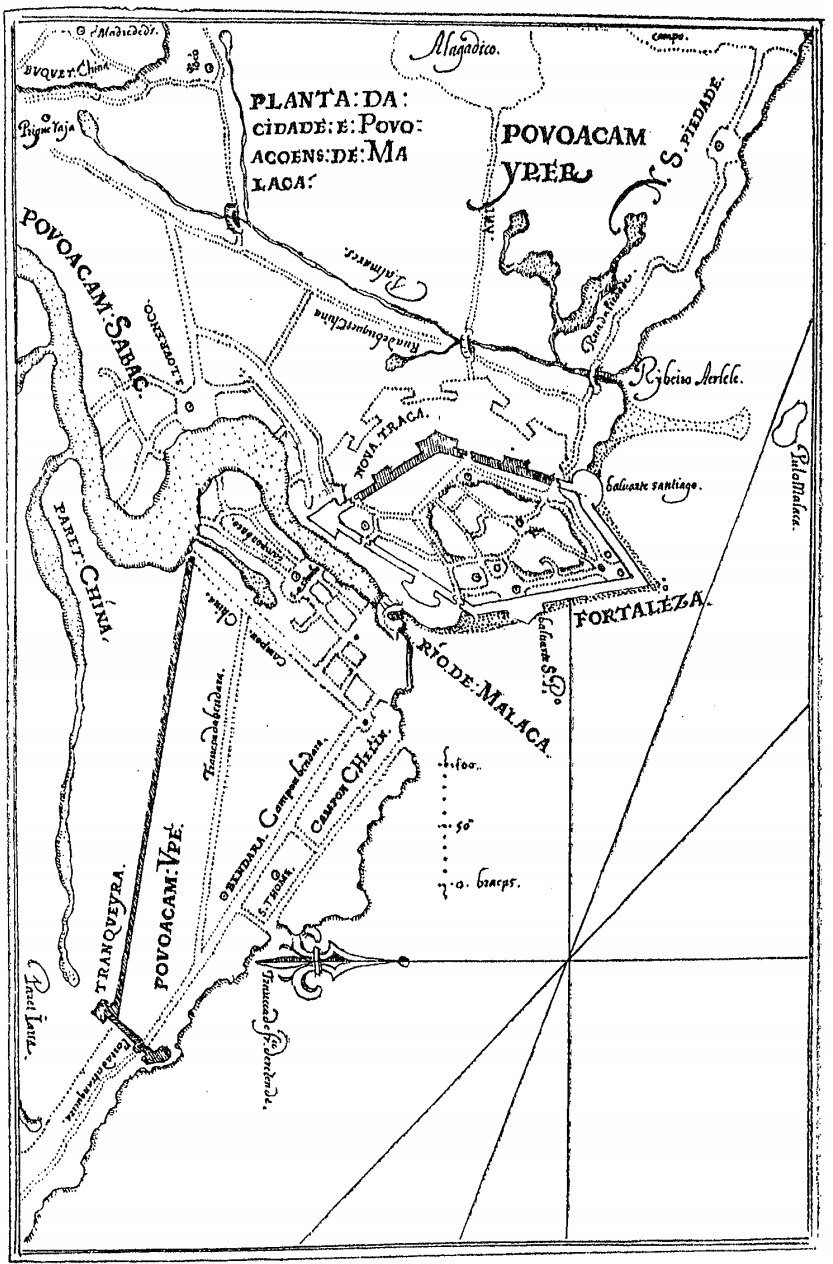
Portuguese map of the city of Malacca in 1604

The Acehnese fleet appeared before Malacca in the first days of June 1629, numbering 236 vessels, 38 of which were very large galleys with three masts bearing top-sails, and armed with heavy bombards capable of firing 20 kg shots, roughly equivalent to galleasses. It bore about 19,000 men, furnished with siege artillery and material, personnally commanded by the Sultan of Aceh. A few days after arriving, Iskandar Muda decided to return home and left the fleet under the command of Marraja, while overall command was entrusted to the Laksamana.

The defenses of Malacca included 260 Portuguese soldiers, 120 casados (literally, "married men", Portuguese residents and Luso-Malay descendants) able to bear arms plus a corps of 400 native Christian auxiliaries. The city was well fortified, well furnished with provisions and prepared for a drawn-out siege. 2,000 warriors sent by the Sultan of Johor arrived from Pahang shortly after the Acehnese, to aid the Portuguese.

Fearful that his ships might be caught off-guard by a Portuguese fleet if he left it anchored out on the open sea, the Laksamana decided harbour them within the Duyon River (2°10′25″N 102°17′21″E) one league (3 miles, 4.8 km) to southeast of Malacca. Seven Acehnese galleys remained outside to intercept any passing merchant vessels carrying provisions to Malacca, but this proved ineffective: captain-general António Pinto da Fonseca had vessels stationed at Pulo Butum and the Strait of Singapore to warn any incoming vessels of the presence of the Acehnese fleet, while at night captain-major Francisco Lopes ran the blockade with light boats, and escorted the merchant vessels into the city, eluding Acehnese patrols, hence throughout the duration of the siege Malacca remained supplied.

On 6 June the Laksamana began disembarking his troops and approaching the city. Despite the Portuguese captain-general sallying out and clashing with the Acehnese to keep them at bay, the Portuguese were gradually forced to relinquish their outer rings of defenses and stockades until after a few weeks when they retreated within the city walls.

Disease spread among the Acehnese, killing many. Encouraged by his success in approaching the city, the Laksamana detached two galleys to inform Iskandar Muda that he expected to have Malacca captured soon, yet these vessels were intercepted by a 60 vessel war-fleet arriving from Johor. All remaining Acehnese vessels withdrew into the Duyon River to avoid capture, and thus the naval line of communication and supply into Malacca was fully secured, ruling out the possibility of starving the Portuguese out.

In spite of the superiority of his fleet relative to that of Johor, the Laksamana chose to ignore it and remain on land to prepare a final assault on the city.

=== Portuguese relief ===
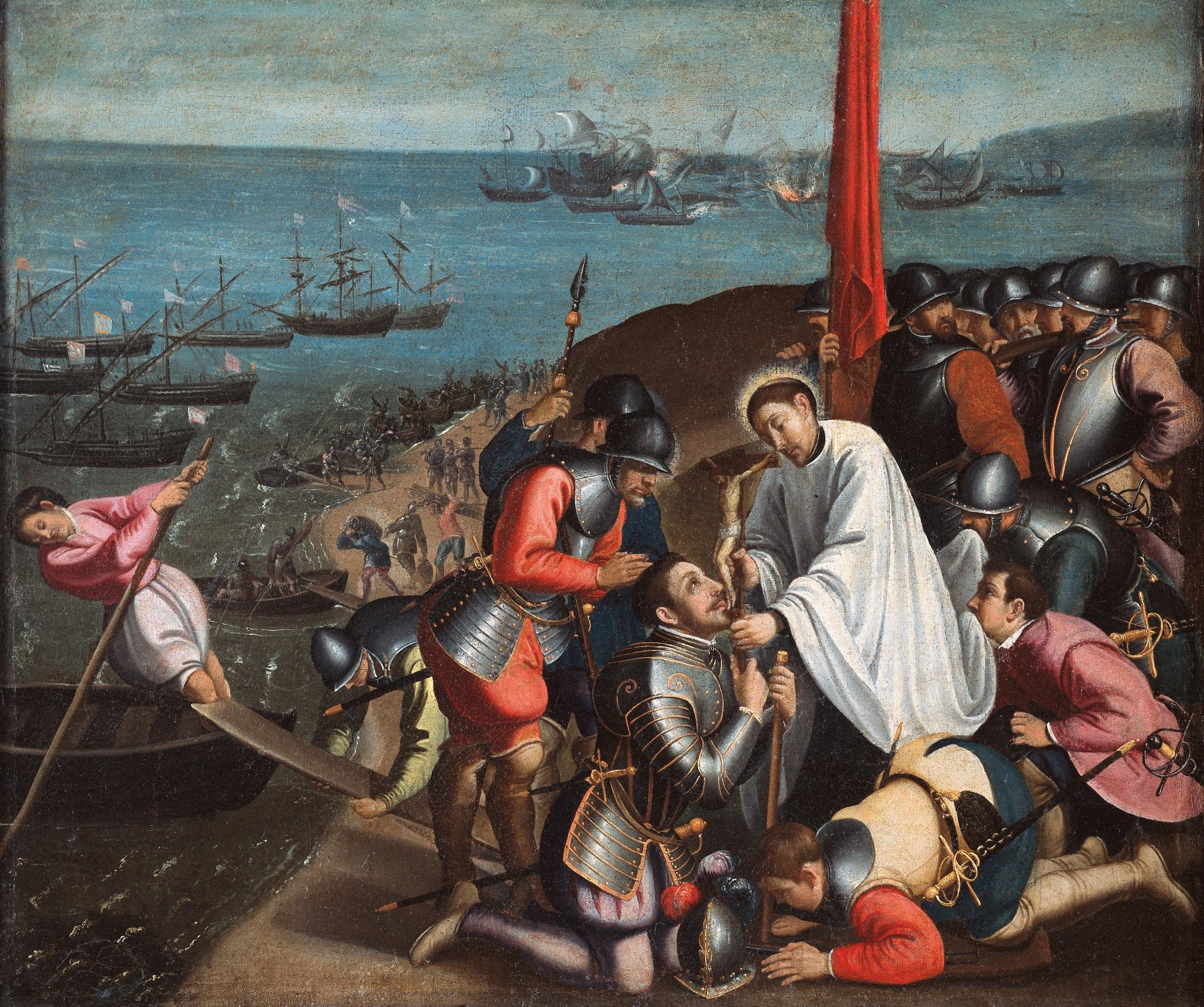
Portuguese soldiers in Malacca fighting the Acehnese in a 1606 painting.

Portuguese India was governed by the aging Bishop of Cochin Luís de Brito who replaced Viceroy Francisco da Gama, who had been dismissed under the accusation of irregularities. The Bishop ordered Miguel Pereira Borralho, then patrolling the Coromandel Coast with a force of light galleys to proceed to Malacca, before dying on 29 June. He was succeeded by a council composed by the captain of Goa Lourenço da Cunha, senior-chancellor Gonçalo Pinto da Fonseca, and Captain-Major of the High Freeboard Fleet of India Dom Nuno Álvares Botelho. Botelho volunteered to personally lead the relief force to Malacca, and as he was a highly respected figure among Portuguese ranks the Portuguese residents of Goa enthusiastically contributed with men, money and supplies for the outfitting of the naval force. Dom Nuno also participated with his own money, and went bankrupt in the process; nevertheless, in order to help two officers who had lost their horses, he offered them his own, and proceeded with the arrangements on foot, which garnered him widespread esteem among his soldiers. The fleet departed from Goa in high spirits on 8 September 1629 to the Malay Peninsula numbering 1 brigantine, 5 half-galleys and 23 light galleys, bearing 900 Portuguese soldiers.

On 30 September Borralho reached Malacca with 100 soldiers, which caused great joy to both the defenders as well as the Acehnese, who believed that was all the relief the Portuguese could hope for.

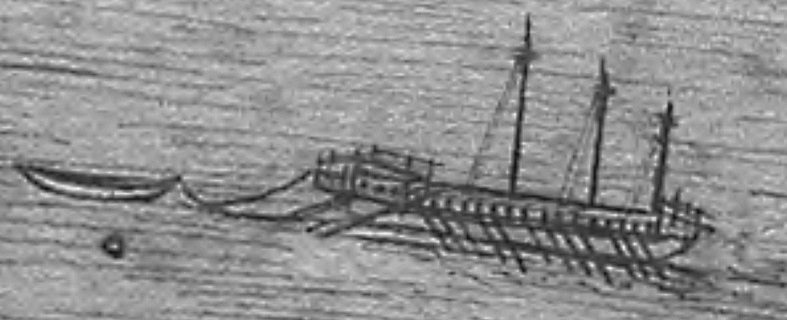
Portuguese sketch of a large, three-masted Acehnese galley.

By daybreak on 21 October the fleet of Botelho arrived in Malacca, brightly decorated and draped in colourful flags, saluting the city with gun salvos, drums, and the shouting of the crews, which were enthusiastically replied by the city's cannon and the ringing of church bells. Among the Acehnese however, morale dropped. After Botelho had been briefed on the situation, the Portuguese fleet took position by the mouth of the Duyon River, three brigantines having joined it, and thus trapping the Acehnese within. The following day, the Acehnese abandoned their positions and retreated to the Duyon River to protect their ships.

=== River battle ===
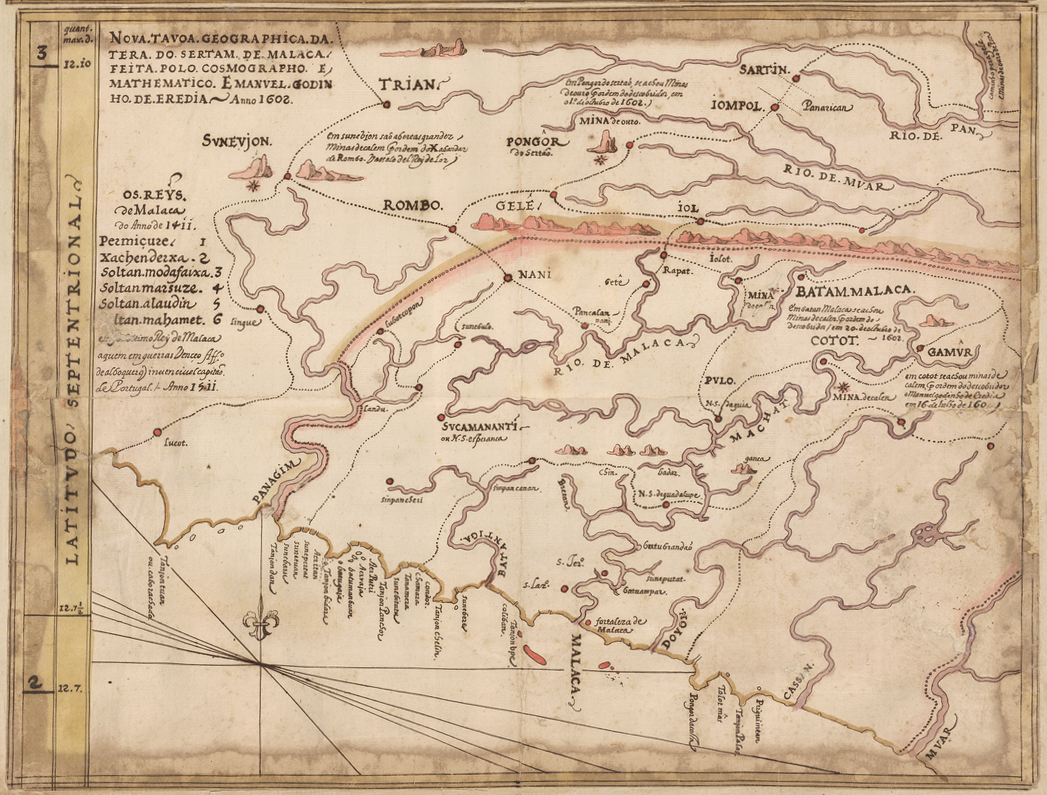
Portuguese map of the region of Malacca.

136 Acehnese ships remained in the Duyon River, as many had been dismantled to erect strong stockades furnished with artillery along each of the river banks. Portuguese ships could not enter the river due to their deeper draught, while the land side fortifications were difficult to assault. Dom Nuno had a ship loaded with stones deliberately sunk by the rivermouth to block the Acehnese fleet from sallying out, while two large gun-barges heavily protected with rope mats and pavises bombarded it from the rivermouth. Acehnese gunners managed to sink one barge, but it was replaced by a brigantine.

Dom Nuno offered the Laksamana the chance to surrender on 29 October, but the Acehnese commander replied with a challenge to a single-duel, which was ignored. By this point the Acehnese had been reduced to no more than 4,000 able-bodied men due to disease, desertion and death in combat. Early in November, the Acehnese attempted to dislodge the sunken vessel at the rivermouth under the cover of darkness, but were detected and forced back.

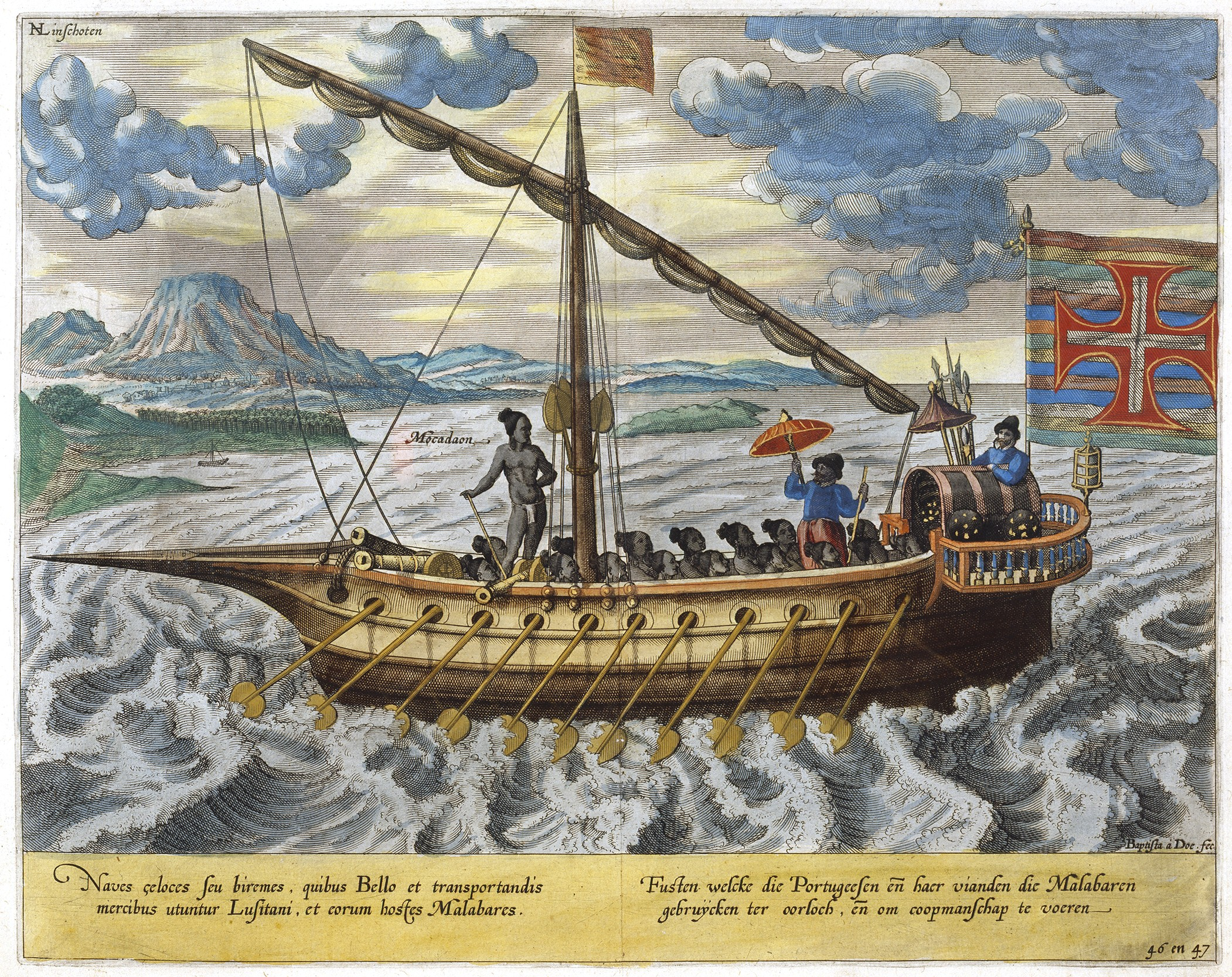
Light Portuguese galley.

With the coming of the spring tide on 8 November, the Acehnese attempted a final, push out of the river, led by their flagship, a very large galley named Wonder of the World. However, the Acehnese flagship crashed against the sunken vessel and came under heavy fire from Portuguese artillery and fire bombs lobbed from Portuguese boats. Unable to break out, it was towed back into the river in flames.

On 30 November Marraja died of an unrecorded cause, and that same day the Portuguese were joined by a strong fleet of 60 vessels from Johor and 100 from Patani, transporting 9,000 warriors and personally commanded by the Sultan of Johor. They would take no part in the fighting, as upon being informed of their arrival the Laksamana sent out the ambassador Pero de Abreu to inform the Portuguese that he wished for terms.

== Aftermath ==
Portuguese naval and war banner, featuring the Cross of the Order of Christ.

As Dom Nuno demanded the unconditional surrender of the Acehnese, the Laksamana refused to give himself in. Instead he set his ships on fire, abandon the wounded and proceed to Pahang overland on 6 December so as to surrender there. The Portuguese captured considerable spoil from the Acehnese camp, that included 30 galleys, 170 Ottoman, Dutch, English and Portuguese artillery pieces, and thousands of firearms and other weapons.

Dom Nuno Álvares Botelho was well received after returning to Malacca in with his success being celebrated with long festivities both in Malacca and Portugal. The Sultan of Johor was also received ashore with full honours. In January the Laksamana reached Pahang, where he was arrested and delivered to the Portuguese.

The huge Acehnese flagship "Wonder of the World" was captured, repaired, and displayed at Malacca and Goa. The Sultan of Perak, a vassal of the Sultan of Aceh, defected and rejoined the Portuguese as an ally.

The Battle of Duyon River proved to be a decisive engagement that ended aggressive Acehnese expansionism and started a period of internal dispute and decline in Aceh. In subsequent years after 1629, Aceh external policy as well as internal theological doctrine would undergo deep changes, reflecting a society in turmoil. Iskandar Muda died in 1637, his successor was reluctant to aid the Dutch and attack Portuguese Malacca. His brief reign was marked by religious turmoil and dispute. He was in turn succeeded by a daughter of Iskandar Muda, who did not continue her father's policy of expansionism, which probably reflected the mood in Aceh after 1629.

The Viceroy of Portuguese India Miguel de Noronha, commented, "I can affirm that all the victories that we read about in the chronicles of India cannot compare with this one." Thus, from a Portuguese perspective, the situation in the straits of Malacca had taken a positive turn.
