= Aljadidah =

Aljadidah (Arabic: الجديدة, al-Dschadīda, literally "The new one") is an international news network mainly targeting an Arabic audience and publishing news in Arabic and German (however, this may literally translate to some Germans as "Der Neue"). It was founded in 2011 by IOT Media GmbH, a media company based in Vienna, Austria. The company is active in the audio, visual, print and digital media domain and cooperating with other national and international media companies such as the German public broadcaster Deutsche Welle. Aljadidah is the first Austrian online magazine for Arabic women.

== Contents ==
The online journal Aljadidah.com covers news ranging from politics, economy and technology to literature, women and youth matters from all over the world, while primarily focusing on the Arab region. Aljadidah.com is a forum for pluralistic opinions and debate, supervised by a group of journalists with professional experience in the media field. Additionally, televised news reports are produced on a weekly basis in the IOT Media studios. A hardcover edition of Aljadidah.com is published regularly and distributed in international political, economic and cultural organizations and institutions throughout Austria and the Arab world.

== Engagement ==
Aljadidah supports the transnational Anti-Drug Online Project MayaPlanet, beside other famous supporters such as Kofi Annan, Dalai Lama XIV and Elton John.
