= Al Jadid (magazine) =

Online literary magazine in Los Angeles, California

- Categories: Literary magazine
- Frequency: Quarterly
- Founder: Elie Chalala
- Founded: 1993
- Final issue: 2019 (print)
- Country: United States of America
- Based in: Los Angeles, California
- Language: English; Arabic
- Website: www.aljadid.com
- ISSN: 1523-746X

Al Jadid (Arabic: The New) is an online magazine with a special reference to Arabic literature. It was a quarterly print publication between 1993 and 2019. The magazine is based in Los Angeles, California, US. Its subtitle is A review and record of Arab culture and arts.

== History and profile ==
Al Jadid was launched by Elie Chalala, a Lebanese, in 1993 as a bilingual publication featuring articles in Arabic and English. In 1995 it was redesigned as a monthly publication covering Arab culture and arts, and most of the articles were published in English. In 1996 it was restarted as a quarterly magazine and began to feature articles in English. Its headquarters is in Los Angeles. As of 2002 he was the editor-in-chief of Al Jadid. The magazine was redesigned as an online-only publication in 2019.
