= Abdul Majid Khan (detainee) =

- Born: 1953 (age 72–73)
- Arrested: 2008-03; Qalat District, Zabul Province
- Detained at: Bagram
- ISN: 3510

On January 15, 2010, the US Department of Defense complied with a court order and published a list of Captives held in the Bagram Theater Internment Facility that included the name Hajj Abdul Majid Khan.

According to historian Andy Worthington, author of The Guantanamo Files, he is alleged to be an improvised explosive device facilitator captured in Qalat district, Zabul Province. He was reported to have "planned and conducted IED attacks against Coalition forces, harbored and facilitated suicide bombers and raised finances for Taliban operations.”
