= Tun Habib Abdul Majid =

Head of the nobility of the Johor Sultanate

Tun Habib Abdul Majid bin Tun Muhammad Ali (1637 – 27 July 1697) was the 19th Bendahara of the Johor Sultanate during the late 17th century. The Johor Sultanate under Sultan Mahmud Shah II (who belonged to the Malacca-Johor royal family) saw a gradual decline of royal authority during Tun Habib's tenure as the Bendahara of Johor. Internal challenges within the Sultanate faced by Tun Habib consolidated his power as the Bendahara, in which case the Bendahara monopolised legitimate authority over the Johor Sultanate by the 1690s. After his death, Tun Habib's descendants spanned throughout the Johor Sultanate and established ruling houses in Riau-Lingga, Johor, Pahang and Terengganu.

== Bendahara of Johor ==
=== Power struggles ===
Little was known of Tun Habib's early life except that he was the son of the Maharaja Sri Diraja of Johor, and that he was jostling for power and recognition with his rival, Laksamana Tun Abdul Jamil during the reign of Sultan Abdul Jalil Shah III.

In 1677, Sultan Ibrahim Shah appointed Tun Habib as the Bendahara of Johor and was assumed the title of "Bendahara Seri Maharaja" the following year. Nevertheless, his authority was quickly overshadowed by the more powerful and experienced Laksamana (who assumed the title of Paduka Raja Laksamana), Tun Abdul Jamil. Tun Abdul Jamil, seeking the advantage of having an inexperienced Sultan, quickly established his power centre at Riau and overshadowed the Sultan's authority and proclaimed himself Regent. He stopped paying tributes to the Sultan even before Sultan Ibrahim Shah's death in 1685, and appointed filled the top ranks with his family members. Naturally, these appointments earned the wrath of many chiefs and top ministers, including Tun Habib himself. The Laksamana, unable to withhold the tremendous opposition from Tun Habib and his allies, fled to Terengganu in 1688 where he was shortly killed after that. Shortly after Tun Abdul Jamil's expulsion, Tun Habib went over to Riau and took the young ruler, Sultan Mahmud Shah II back to Johor.

=== Later career ===
The death of Tun Abdul Jamil allowed Tun Habib to reassert his position as the Bendahara once more. Tun Habib's return saw the position of the Bendahara in a more powerful position, given that the ruler was deemed too young and inexperienced to exert effective control over Johor's affairs. At least on the ceremonial side, Tun Habib swore allegiance to the young Sultan even as he wielded sole effective authority over the kingdom. In April 1691, a Dutch mercenary fleet visited Johor to seek for trade agreements with Tun Habib, to which he steadfastly turned down by citing that he was not to sign any agreements on his own accord until the Sultan reaches maturity of age.

Tun Habib was also reportedly well-loved and respected among his subjects and often worked closely with his ministers (Orang Kaya). Shortly after he regained power, Tun Habib relocated the Johor Empire's capital to Kota Tinggi. He also took charge of state affairs by proxy in Terengganu, at that time a sparsely populated state. Sultan Mahmud was given more opportunities to participate in state roles under Tun Habib, although it was the latter who wielded the actual control over the Sultanate's affairs. Tun Habib later died in Padang Saujana, Kota Tinggi in 1697, where he was buried. His oldest son, Abdul Jalil, succeeded him as the 20th Bendahara of Johor but usurped the throne from Sultan Mahmud Shah II just two years later in 1699 and took the title Sultan Abdul Jalil IV. His 5th son, Zainal Abidin, who was living in Pattani, came down to Terengganu and became its first Sultan.

== Family ==
=== Ancestry ===
Tun Habib's mother was of Malay ethnicity; while his father was of mixed ancestry. His great-grandfather, Sayyid Abdullah Al-Aidrus, was a Hadhrami Arab immigrant who settled in Aceh. His son, Sayyid Zainal Abidin, migrated to Johor and married the granddaughter of Tun Sri Lanang by his son, Tun Jenal, the 5th Bendahara of Sekudai. It was from this union that the Maharaja Sri Diraja, the Dato Pasir Diraja (Sayyid Ja'afar) and Putri Bakal were born. Putri Bakal was believed to have later married Sultan Mahmud Shah II.

The name "Habib" was a local Acehnese variant of the "Sayyid", an honorific title used by descendants of the Prophet Muhammad. However, in lieu of terse relations between Aceh with its neighbours in the 16th century, Tun Habib's name revealed his Acehnese heritage served to raise suspicions when it came to political matters. His descendants gave up the use of "Habib" in their names.

=== Descendants ===
Tun Habib had several sons by different wives, all of whom rose to influential positions. He had at least six sons: Tun (Habib) Abdul Jalil, Tun Abdullah, Tun Abdul Jamal, Tun Mas Anum, Tun Zainal Abidin and Tun Mas Jiwa were all later appointed as Bendaharas. Among these sons, Tun Abdul Jalil and Tun Zainal Abidin later established their own independent ruling houses in Johor-Riau and Terengganu respectively.

- House of Bendahara, established by Sultan Abdul Jalil Riayat Shah IV which ruled Johor from 1699 until 1812 (albeit an interregnum between 1718 and 1722). In 1812, the death of Sultan Mahmud Shah III sparked a succession crisis between Tengku Abdul Rahman and his younger brother Tengku Hussein. The British, who came to the region in 1819 saw a royal house rivalled by succession dispute and took to task of recognising Sultan Hussein Shah as the Sultan of Johor and Singapore, while giving Tengku Abdul Rahman the title "Ruler of Singapore. The royal regalia was given to the Lingga-based Tengku Abdul Rahman who was supported by the Bugis nobles and Bendahara Ali of Pahang. The Anglo-Dutch Treaty of 1824 had the effect of splitting the royal household into two factions:

- House of Bendahara (Johor): Based in Johor, this branch was headed by Sultan Hussein Shah until his death in 1824, although the Temenggong wielded more actual authority than the Sultan, largely because of a lack of legitimate recognition among the Malay nobles. Hussein Shah's successor, Ali, while he managed to get hold of the royal seal to claim legitimacy to his rule, was quickly overshadowed by the more powerful Temenggong. Under British pressure, he was forced to cede soveriginity rights over Johor (except Muar) to Temenggong Daeng Ibrahim in 1855. Sultan Ali died in 1877.
- House of Riau-Lingga: This branch was based in Lingga and headed by Sultan Abdul Rahman, who was supported by the Bugis nobles. He later died in 1832 and was succeeded by his son, Muhammad Shah and subsequently his grandson, Mahmud Muzaffar Shah in 1841. Sultan Mahmud Muzaffar Shah was deposed in 1857 by the Dutch, which was also supported by the Bugis nobles. In his later years, he began to claim recognition as the legitimate ruler of the Johor-Riau empire. This royal house lasted until 3 February 1911, when the Dutch assumed full control over Riau and Lingga.

- House of Temenggong (Johor), established by Temenggong Tun Daeng Ibrahim, a descendant of Sultan Abdul Jalil Riayat Shah IV by his non-royal son Tun Abbas. The present Sultan of Johor belongs to this royal house.
- House of Bendahara (Pahang): The current Sultan of Pahang traces his lineage to Sultan Wan Ahmad of Pahang, a descendant of Tun Abbas. (At one point of time another royal lineage that was related to the Malacca royal family (descended from Parameswara) also ruled Pahang, but later died out.
- The current Sultan of Terengganu is a descendant of Sultan Zainal Abidin I, the 5th and youngest son of Tun Habib.
