= Abdelmadjid Meskoud =

Algerian chaabi singer (1953–2026)

- عبدالمجيد مسكود
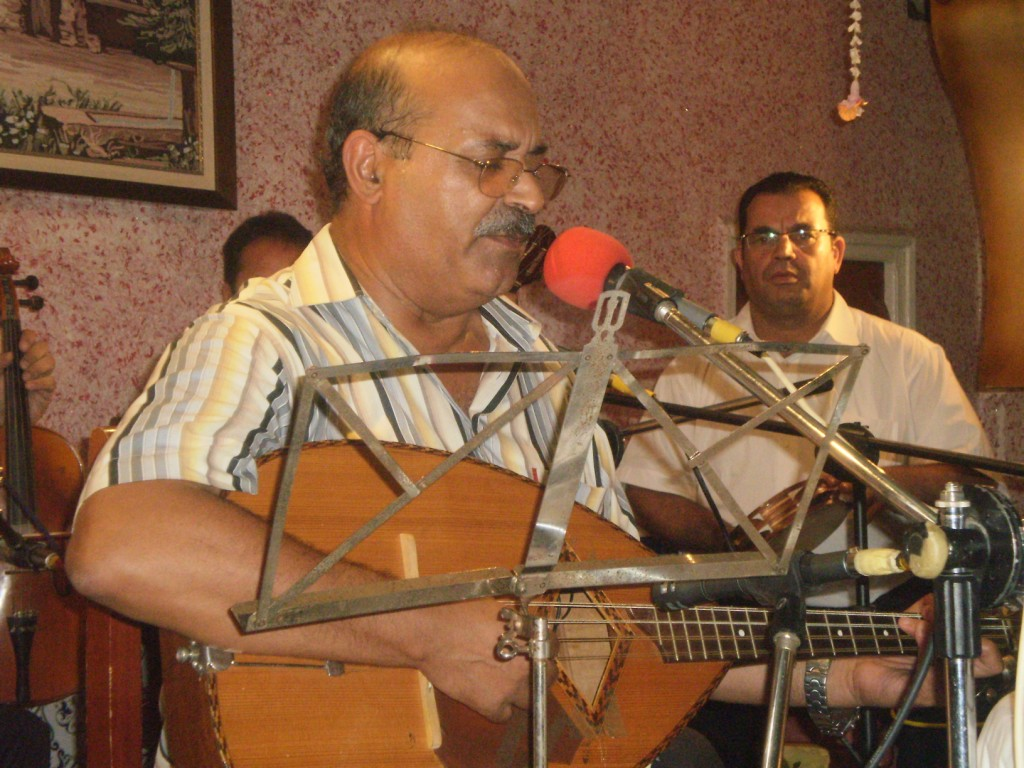
- Meskoud in 2010
- Born: 31 March 1953; Algiers, French Algeria
- Died: 14 May 2026 (aged 73); Algiers, Algeria
- Occupation: Singer

Abdelmadjid Meskoud (Arabic: عبدالمجيد مسكود; 31 March 1953 – 14 May 2026) was an Algerian chaabi singer.

Meskoud began his musical career in 1969 and sang of his melancholy attitude toward the transformation of Algiers. He was notably inducted into the National Order of Merit.

Meskoud died of complications from a stroke in Algiers, on 14 May 2026, at the age of 73.
