= Abdelmajid Benjelloun (historian) =

Moroccan writer and historian

Abdelmajid Benjelloun (Arabic: عبد المجيد بن جلون, romanized: ʿAbd al-Majīd bin Jallūn; born 1944 in Fez) is a Moroccan author, historian and poet. He is a specialist in the history of North Morocco. He taught Public Law at the Casablanca University since 1983. He is a member of 'la Maison de la poésie du Maroc' and professor in the history of international relations at the department of Law at the Mohammed V University in Rabat since 2002. Since 1999 he produces a French language program on Moroccan radio (RTM), Paroles d'esplanade. Benjelloun is also a painter.

== Bibliography ==
Works on History

- Approches du colonialisme espagnol et du mouvement nationaliste marocain (Khalifien. OKAD, Rabat, 1990)
- le patriotisme marocain face au protectorat espagnol (Imp. El Maârif, Rabat, 1993
- Fragments d'histoire du Rif oriental 1994
- Pour une approche possible de l'histoire des institutions et des faits sociaux (Toubkal, 1997)
- Le Nord du Maroc - l'Indépendance avant l'indépendance, Harmattan, 1997
- Etudes d'histoire contemporaine du Maroc, Zaghouan, 2000 ISBN 9973-719-97-2.

Literature

- Etres et choses, le même silence, Saint-germain-des-pres, 1976
- Qui tire sur les bretelles de ma respiration, ed. A die, 1991
- Les sept cieux apparents du mot, Aphorismes poétiques, ed. E.m.a.j, 1993
- La mort d'un proche ne se termine jamais, Casablanca, éd. Toubkal, 1998
- Anthologie poétique, Flammes Vives, 2000
- Mama, (auto-biographical novel) with an introduction by William Cliff, Paris, éd. du Rocher, coll. Anatolia, 2002
- L'éternité ne penche que du côté de l'amour (William Blake and co, 2002)
- Hassane l’andalou, ou l’étoile de la manquante était bien allumée, Rabat, éd. Racines, 2007
