= Abdelmajid Ben Belgacem =

Tunisian footballer

Personal information
- Date of birth: 4 February 1986 (age 40)
- Position: Forward

Senior career*
Years	Team	Apps	(Gls)
2006–2010	US Monastir		
2010–2013	ES Hammam-Sousse		

International career
2009	Tunisia	1	(0)
- * Club domestic league appearances and goals

Abdelmajid Ben Belgacem (born 4 February 1986) is a retired Tunisian football striker.
