= Abdelmajid R'chich =

Moroccan filmmaker

- Born: 28 March 1942 (age 83); Kenitra, Morocco
- Occupation: Film director

Abdelmajid R'chich (also spelled Rechiche) (born March 28, 1942, in Kenitra) is a Moroccan filmmaker.

== Biography ==
R'chich studied directing at the IDHEC in Paris, where he graduated in 1963. Upon his return to Morocco a year later, he worked at the Moroccan Film Center (CCM) as a cameraman, before putting his film career on pause for a year to study anthropology and art history at the Université libre de Bruxelles.

== Filmography ==
=== Short films ===
- 1968: 6/12
- 1970: Forêt (Forest)
- 1973: Al Boraq
- 1975: La Marche verte (The Green March)
- 1978: Scènes de chasse au Dadès
- 1982: Le Maroc Reve des Investisseurs
- 1988: Itineraires D'Enface
- 1993: Mosquée Hassan II (Hassan II Mosque)
- 1995: Salé, la splendeur d'une mémoire
- 1996: Le Partage des eaux (The Sharing of Waters)
- 1998: Kasbahs et Ksours (Kasbahs and Castles)

=== Feature films ===
- 2000: L'Histoire d'une rose (The Story of a Rose)
- 2005: Ailes brisées (Shattered Wings)
- 2011: Mémoire d'argile (Memory of Clay)
