= 'Abd al-Majid Nimer Zaghmout =

Palestinian political prisoner

'Abd al-Majid Nimer Zaghmout (died 15 February 2000) was a Palestinian national imprisoned in Syria who was described by Amnesty International as "possibly the longest-serving arbitrarily detained political prisoner in the Middle East". He was formerly a member of Fatah, a mainstream faction of the Palestine Liberation Organization. At his death, Zaghmout was arguably the longest-serving political prisoner in the world.

== Arrest, trial and imprisonment ==
He was arrested in 1966 and charged with the politically motivated murder of the Palestinian guerrilla leader Yusuf 'Urabi. He denied the charges and alleged he had been tortured for 46 days after his arrest to force him to confess. After a trial described in some quarters as "unfair", he was sentenced to death by a military court.

The Syrian Minister of Defence, General Mustafa Tlass, ordered his release in 1989, but the order was not carried out.

== Death ==
Zaghmout died of cancer in a military hospital on 15 February 2000.
