= Abdolmajid Eskandari =

Abdolmajid Eskandari is an Iranian that serves as the Director General of the Office of International Relations, University of Tehran. He is a graduate of English Language and Literature who has been serving in the Office of International Relations, University of Tehran, Iran for 37 years.

Eskandari is a translator, and researcher with more than one thousand published translated articles and research papers in local and international newspapers and journals as well. He has participated in a great number of national and international conferences and presented scholarly papers.

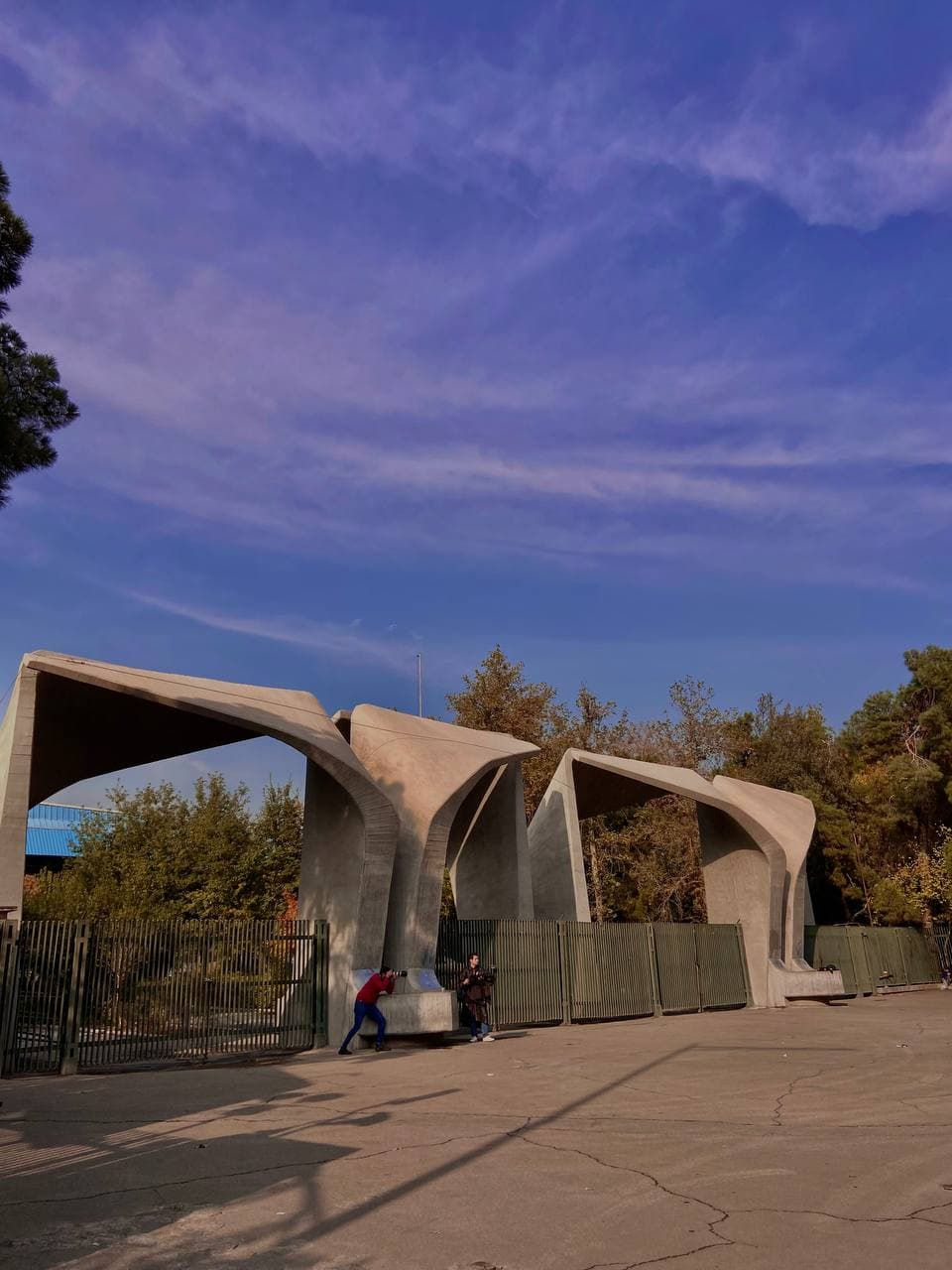
UNIVERSITY OF TEHRAN
