= Tun Sri Lanang =

17th-century Malay politician

Tun Muhammad bin Tun Ahmad, better known as Tun Sri Lanang, was the Bendahara of the royal court of the Johor Sultanate who lived between the 16th and 17th centuries. He served under two sultans of Johor, namely; Sultan Ali Jalla Abdul Jalil Shah II (1570–1597) and Sultan Alauddin Riayat Shah III (1597–1615) and also advisers to three rulers of the Aceh Sultanate namely; Sultan Iskandar Muda (until 1636), Sultan Iskandar Thani (1636–1641) and Sultana Tajul Alam Safiatuddin Shah (1641–1675). He had two honorific titles throughout his lifetime; as the Bendahara of Johor, Bendahara Paduka Raja Tun Mohamad, while he was given the title of Orang Kaya Dato' Bendahara Seri Paduka Tun Seberang after settling in Aceh.

== Early life and events in Johor ==
Tun Sri Lanang was born in 1565 in Seluyut, Johor, and was descended from Tun Tahir, a brother of Bendahara Tun Mutahir of Malacca. There are not many records about his tenure as Bendahara in Johor. However, during the rule of Sultan Alauddin Riayat Shah III, he shouldered a heavier burden on the affairs of the state as the Sultan is a weak ruler. He shared the responsibility with the Sultan's brother Raja Abdullah (later to become Sultan Abdullah Ma'ayat Shah reigning between 1615 and 1623).

During the period the Dutch were attacking the Portuguese for the port of Malacca. The Dutch signed a friendship treaty with the Johor Sultanate (in 1606) with Tun Sri Lanang as representative. Tun Sri Lanang refused the Dutch request of helping the Dutch to blockade the port of Malacca preferring the Dutch do it themselves.

In 1612, at the request of Raja Abdullah to pen the Malay Annals to ensure " ... all the adat, the rules and the ceremonies of the Malay sultans and rajas to be heard by our descendants and is made known all utterances so that it may benefit them". At this time, under the orders of Sultan Alauddin Riayat Shah, Tun Sri Lanang oversaw the editorial and compilation process of the Malay Annals, better known as Sejarah Melayu in Malay.

In 1613, Aceh attacked Johor and in the battle of Batu Sawar. Johor was defeated and the Royal Family and Tun Sri Lanang was captured and brought to Aceh. The Bendaharaship was continued by his descendants. His notable descendants include Raja Temenggong of Muar and the Bendahara Tun Habib Abdul Majid, the latter being an ancestor to the various branches of the current Johor royal family.

== Later life in Aceh ==
After a brief "reeducation" in Aceh, the Johor Royal Family was returned to Johor. Tun Sri Lanang elected to stay in Aceh. He became advisor to the third Sultan of Aceh and was bestowed an Aceh honorific title. He was awarded a personal fief in Samalanga, Aceh in 1613 and held the title Uleebalang of Samalanga. He died in 1659 in Samalanga.

== Legacy ==
Some of Tun Sri Lanang's descendants ruled as the Uleebalang of Samalanga until 1949, when Indonesia was formed in the same year. Many of his descendants were fervent nationalists including the female warrior Pocut Meuligo, Teuku Muhammad Daud, Teuku Abdul Hamid Azwar and Teuku Hamzah Bendahara. Some of his descendants carry the "Bendahara" suffix to their names indicating their ancestry.

His legacy is not only the rewriting and compiling of the magnum opus "Sejarah Melayu" but also includes the strongly Islamic flavor of Samalanga. Samalanga is also known as "Kota Santri", or "Town of Medrassas" is the centre of Islamic propagation in Aceh until today. Samalanga was also among the last town to fall to the Dutch during the time of the last Sultan of Aceh, Sultan Muhammad Daud Shah and also one of his strongholds.

=== Places named in honour of Tun Sri Lanang ===
==== Buildings and Institutions ====
- Laman Tun Sri Lanang, Kota Tinggi
- Perpustakaan Tun Seri Lanang, Universiti Kebangsaan Malaysia
- Tun Seri Lanang Secondary School, former Secondary school in Singapore

==== Roads ====
- Jalan Persiaran Tun Sri Lanang, Johor Bahru
- Jalan Tun Sri Lanang, Malacca

== Notes ==
- Agus bin Salim, Abdul Ghani bin Abdul Aziz (1966). Tokoh yang Kukoh, dalam Kesusasteraan Melayu Lama dan Baru, oleh Agus Salim: Dengan Sejarah Sastera. Pustaka Nasional.
- Haji Buyong bin Adil, Sejarah Terengganu, published by Dewan Bahasa dan Pustaka, Kementerian Pelajaran Malaysia, 1974
- Hamilton, A.W. (1933). "Source of the Malacca Johore and Pahang Genealogies". Journal of the Malayan Branch of the Royal Asiatic Society.
- Safian Hussain, Johan Jaaffar, Mohd. Thani Ahmad, Hawa Abdullah (1992). History of Modern Malay Literature. Malaysia: Dewan Bahasa dan Pustaka. ISBN 983-62-2745-8.
- (Tun) Suzana (Tun) Othman (2008). Tun Seri Lanang, Sejarah dan Warisan Tokoh Melayu Tradisional. Media Satria. ISBN 978-983-43485-6-4.
- (Tun) Suzana (Tun) Othman, Institusi Bendahara; Permata Melayu yang hilang, 2002, ISBN 983-40566-6-4
- Winstedt, R. O, A History of Johore (1365–1941), (M.B.R.A.S. Reprints, 6.) Kuala Lumpur: Malaysian Branch of the Royal Asiatic Society, 1992, ISBN 983-99614-6-2
