= Abdul Majid (football coach) =

Kenyan Football Manager

Abdul Majid is a former coach of the Kenya National team in 1998 who was later replaced by Nigerian Christian Chukwu. Majid is best remembered for leading Kenya to one of its best results after edging out Djibouti 9-1 in August 1998. Beyond the National team, Majid coached Kenyan club Rivatex FC whom he led to Moi Golden Cup win in 1990 becoming the first team outside Nairobi to achieve that fete.
