= Abdolmajid Mahdavi Damghani =

Iranian sociologist

- عبدالمجید مهدوی دامغانی
- Education: Ferdowsi University of Mashad (PhD)
- Known for: works on organic agriculture
- Scientific career
- Fields: agroecology
- Workplaces: Shahid Beheshti University

Abdolmajid Mahdavi Damghani (Persian: عبدالمجید مهدوی دامغانی) is an Iranian agroecologist and associate professor at Shahid Beheshti University. His book Sustainable Production of Agricultural Products was praised in the ceremony for the Iran Book of the Year Award.

== Books ==
- An Introduction to Organic Agriculture, with Behnam Kamkar, ACECR, 2008, ISBN 964-324-170-X
- Principles of Sustainable Agriculture, with Hossein Mahmmodi and Hooman Liaghati, ACECR, 2011, ISBN 964-324-158-0
- Sustainable Production of Agricultural Products, with Eskandar Zand and Alireza Koochaki, Iran University Press, 2013, ISBN 978-964-01-1444-5

== See also ==
- Papaver somniferum
