= Al-Judaydah, Mahardah =

Al-Judaydah الجديدة
- Village
- Location in Syria
- Coordinates: 35°16′56″N 36°32′13″E
- Country: Syria
- Governorate: Hama
- District: Mahardah
- Subdistrict: Mahardah

Population (2004)
  - Total: 2,166
- Time zone: UTC+3 (AST)
- City Qrya Pcode: C3454

Al-Judaydah (Arabic: الجديدة, also spelled Jadideh or Jdeideh) is a Syrian village in the Mahardah Subdistrict of the Mahardah District in Hama Governorate. According to the Syria Central Bureau of Statistics (CBS), al-Judaydah had a population of 2,166 at the 2004 census.
