= Al-Judaydah, Salamiyah =

Al-Judaydah الجديدة
- Village
- Location in Syria
- Coordinates: 35°16′47″N 37°9′49″E
- Country: Syria
- Governorate: Hama
- District: Salamiyah
- Subdistrict: Sabburah

Population (2004)
  - Total: 177
- Time zone: UTC+3 (AST)
- City Qrya Pcode: C3294

Al-Judaydah (Arabic: الجديدة) is a Syrian village located in Sabburah Subdistrict in Salamiyah District, Hama. According to the Syria Central Bureau of Statistics (CBS), al-Judaydah had a population of 177 in the 2004 census.
