= Al-Judayyda =

- District
- Location within Jordan
- Country: Jordan
- Governorate: Karak
- Time zone: GMT +2
  - Summer (DST): +3

Al-Judayyda (Arabic: الجديدة) is one of the districts of Karak governorate, Jordan.
