= Atif Abdelmageed =

Sudanese doctor

Dr Atif Abdelmageed

Executive Director of the Arab Regional Scout Office of the World Scout Bureau

Dr. Atif Abdelmageed Abdelrahman Ahmed from Khartoum, Sudan (Arabic: عاطف عبد المجيد; born June 7) serves as executive director of the Arab Regional Scout Office of the World Scout Bureau. In 2006, he was named Director of the Arab Region.

He was previously in charge of the Sudanese Air Scout program, and is a gliding pilot. He studied medicine at the University of Juba and Pennsylvania State University, worked for the World Health Organization, lived in Omdurman, and lives in Nasr City, a district of Cairo, Egypt.
