= 1990 in Malaysia =

- Decades: 1970s; 1980s; 1990s; 2000s; 2010s
- See also: Other events of 1990; History of Malaysia • Timeline • Years

This article lists important figures and events in Malaysian public affairs during the year 1990, together with births and deaths of notable Malaysians.

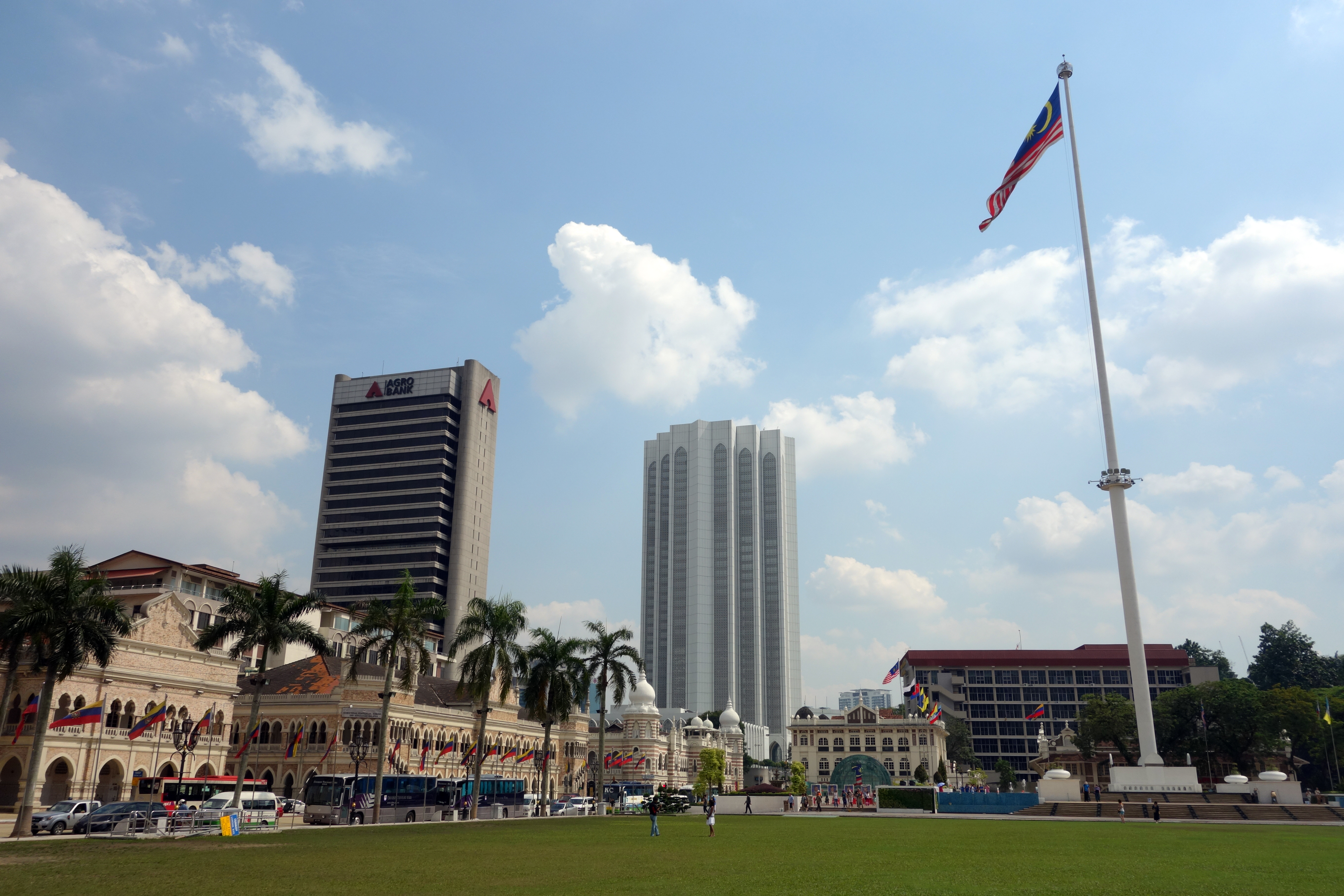
Merdeka Square in central Kuala Lumpur

The Kuala Lumpur federal territory and city flag was adopted on 14 May 1990 following the celebration of 100 anniversary of local authority

== Incumbent political figures ==
=== Federal level ===
- Yang di-Pertuan Agong: Sultan Azlan Shah
- Raja Permaisuri Agong: Tuanku Bainun
- Prime Minister: Dato' Sri Dr Mahathir Mohamad
- Deputy Prime Minister: Dato' Ghafar Baba
- Lord President: Abdul Hamid Omar

=== State level ===
- Sultan of Johor: Sultan Iskandar
- Sultan of Kedah: Sultan Abdul Halim Muadzam Shah
- Sultan of Kelantan: Sultan Ismail Petra
- Raja of Perlis: Tuanku Syed Putra
- Sultan of Perak: Raja Nazrin Shah (Regent)
- Sultan of Pahang: Sultan Ahmad Shah
- Sultan of Selangor: Sultan Salahuddin Abdul Aziz Shah
- Sultan of Terengganu: Sultan Mahmud Al-Muktafi Billah Shah
- Yang di-Pertuan Besar of Negeri Sembilan: Tuanku Jaafar (Deputy Yang di-Pertuan Agong)
- Yang di-Pertua Negeri (Governor) of Penang: Tun Dr Hamdan Sheikh Tahir
- Yang di-Pertua Negeri (Governor) of Malacca: Tun Syed Ahmad Al-Haj bin Syed Mahmud Shahabuddin
- Yang di-Pertua Negeri (Governor) of Sarawak: Tun Ahmad Zaidi Adruce Mohammed Noor
- Yang di-Pertua Negeri (Governor) of Sabah: Tun Said Keruak

== Events ==
- 1 January – The introduction of unleaded petrol in Malaysia.
- 1 January – Visit Malaysia Year 1990 officially began.
- 2 January – The Amanah Saham Bumiputra (ASB) scheme launched.
- 28 February – 17 people including 11 Federal Reserve Unit (FRU) riot police personal were killed in a collision between FRU riot police vehicles, tankers lorry, a passenger bus and ten cars at kilometre 31 of the Kuala Lumpur-Karak Highway not far from Genting Sempah Tunnel in Gombak, Selangor.
- 14 May – Kuala Lumpur celebrated 100 years of local authority. The new federal territory of Kuala Lumpur flag and anthem were introduced.
- 1 June – The first Non-Aligned Summit Meeting G15 held in Kuala Lumpur
- 2 June – P. Ramlee awarded the Darjah Panglima Setia Mahkota (DPSM) highest award with a title Tan Sri
- 2 July – A stampede inside a pedestrian tunnel (Al-Ma'aisim Tunnel) leading out from Mecca towards Mina and the Plains of Arafat led to the deaths of 1,426 pilgrims including 122 Malaysians.
- 11 July – Malaysia Agriculture Park (Taman Pertanian Malaysia), Bukit Cahaya Seri Alam opened to the public.
- 3 August – Proton Saga with Megavalve engine is launched.
- 1 September – The Lembaga Letrik Negara (National Electricity Board) (LLN) was incorporated as Tenaga Nasional Berhad (TNB).
- 11 October – The last Social and Welfare Lottery draw was held, as the Malaysian government aspire to promote the assimilation of Islamic values in public administration and not involve directly in gambling activities. The end of such lotteries was announced in April.
- 17 October – The Communist insurgency in Sarawak was officially over. The peace treaty between Malaysia government and the second bureau of the North Kalimantan Communist Party was signed in Kuching, Sarawak.
- 21 October – The Malaysian General Elections. Kelantan now led by the PAS party.
- 1 November – South Africa's anti-apartheid leader, Nelson Mandela began a four-day visit to Malaysia.
- 6 December – Tunku Abdul Rahman Putra Al-Haj, the first Malaysian Prime Minister, also known as the "Father of Malayan Independence" or "Father of Malaysia" died. His body was brought back to Kedah and laid to rest at Kedah Royal Mausoleum, Langgar, Kedah.

== Births ==
- 27 February – Hafiz Suip – Singer
- 14 March – Siti Saleha – Actress
- 15 March – Muhammad Ziyad Zolkefli – Shot Putter
- 21 March – Ahmad Aminuddin Shaharuddin – Football player
- 16 April – Cheong Jun Hoong – Diver
- 2 June – Izzue Islam – Actor and singer
- 30 June – Bryan Nickson Lomas – Diver
- 5 July – Tunku Abdul Jalil ibni Sultan Ibrahim Ismail – Tunku Laksamana of Johor (died 2015)
- 18 July – Mohd Azniee Taib – Football player
- 2 August – Juzzthin – Actor and singer
- 13 August – Shila Amzah – Singer
- 18 August – Stracie Angie Anam (Stacy) – Singer
- 14 September – Fattah Amin – Actor
- 19 September – Alif Satar – Singer
- 9 October – Hanis Zalikha – Actress, TV host and blogger
- 24 December – Tengku Amir Shah – Raja Muda of Selangor
- 30 December – Nik Shahrul Azim Abdul Halim – Football player

== Deaths ==
- 17 June – Bai Simu, Former Commander of the 8th MNLA Regiment (b. 1921).
- 29 August – Chin Fung Kee, civil engineer (b. 1920).
- 3 September – Chen Tien, Member of the Central Committee of the Malayan Communist Party and one of the three CPM representatives in the Baling Talks (b. 1923).
- 19 November – Wu Yi Shek, Member of the Politburo of the Malayan Communist Party and Commander of the 12th MNLA Regiment (b. 1922).
- 6 December – Tunku Abdul Rahman Putra Al-Haj, 1st Prime Minister of Malaysia, also known as "Father of Malayan Independence" and "Father of Malaysia" (b. 1903).

== See also ==
- 1990
- 1989 in Malaysia | 1991 in Malaysia
- History of Malaysia
