= 1993 in Malaysia =

- Decades: 1970s; 1980s; 1990s; 2000s; 2010s
- See also: Other events of 1993; History of Malaysia • Timeline • Years

This article lists important figures and events in Malaysian public affairs during the year 1993, together with births and deaths of notable Malaysians. The deadliest structural failure in Malaysian history occurred when an apartment block in Selangor collapsed, killing 48 people on 11 December.

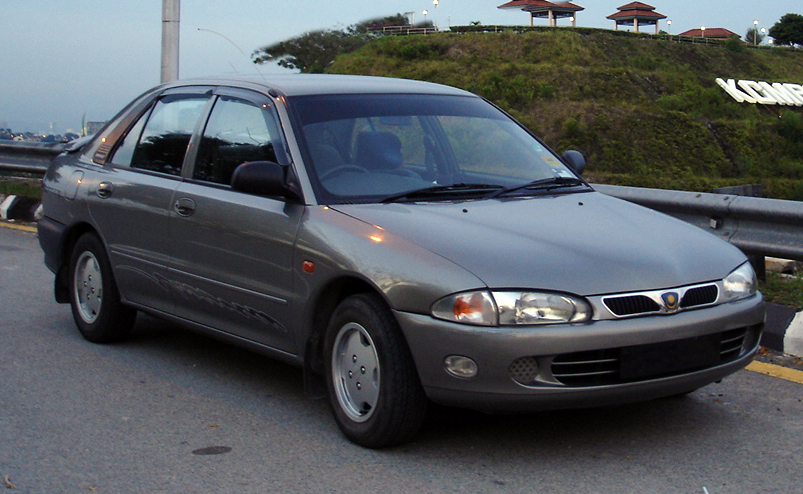
The Proton Wira, launched in 1993

== Incumbent political figures ==
=== Federal level ===
- Yang di-Pertuan Agong: Sultan Azlan Shah
- Raja Permaisuri Agong: Tuanku Bainun
- Prime Minister: Dato' Seri Dr Mahathir Mohamad
- Deputy Prime Minister:
  - Dato' Ghafar Baba (until 30 November)
  - Dato' Seri Anwar Ibrahim (from 1 December)
- Lord President: Abdul Hamid Omar

=== State level ===
- Sultan of Johor: Sultan Iskandar
- Sultan of Kedah: Sultan Abdul Halim Muadzam Shah
- Sultan of Kelantan: Sultan Ismail Petra
- Raja of Perlis: Tuanku Syed Putra
- Sultan of Perak: Raja Nazrin Shah (Regent)
- Sultan of Pahang: Sultan Ahmad Shah
- Sultan of Selangor: Sultan Salahuddin Abdul Aziz Shah
- Sultan of Terengganu: Sultan Mahmud Al-Muktafi Billah Shah
- Yang di-Pertuan Besar of Negeri Sembilan: Tuanku Jaafar (Deputy Yang di-Pertuan Agong)
- Yang di-Pertua Negeri (Governor) of Penang: Tun Dr Hamdan Sheikh Tahir
- Yang di-Pertua Negeri (Governor) of Malacca: Tun Syed Ahmad Al-Haj bin Syed Mahmud Shahabuddin
- Yang di-Pertua Negeri (Governor) of Sarawak: Tun Ahmad Zaidi Adruce Mohammed Noor
- Yang di-Pertua Negeri (Governor) of Sabah: Tun Said Keruak

== Events ==
- 1 January – The Malaysian Highway Network Development Plan blueprint was launched.
- 11 January – The Malaysia Crime Prevention Foundation was established.
- 1 March – The Securities Commission (SC) was established.
- March – The Constitutional Amendment Bill to strip the Malay Rulers of their legal immunity from prosecution and other privileges was passed and came into force.
- 2–4 April – 1993 Malaysian motorcycle Grand Prix
- April – Malaysia sent the Malaysian Battalion (MALBATT) peacekeepers to Bosnia and Herzegovina as part of the United Nations Protection Force (UNPROFOR).
- 21 May – The Proton Wira, the second car in the line of Proton cars, was launched.
- 1 June – The ground-breaking ceremony for the new Kuala Lumpur International Airport (KLIA) in Sepang by the Prime Minister, Mahathir Mohamad.
- 3–11 July – The fifteenth edition of the Men's Champions Trophy at the Tun Razak Stadium in Kuala Lumpur.
- 18 July – Dato' Mazlan Idris, a Batu Talam DUN assemblyman for Pahang state was murdered by Maznah Ismail aka Mona Fandey, Mohd Affendi Abdul Rahman and Juraimi Hussin.
- 31 August – The Negaraku national anthem was given a new quick-march version.
- 4 September - Kuching Waterfront in Kuching, Sarawak was officially launched.
- 3–4 October – Private Mat Aznan Awang, a Malaysian soldier was killed in action during the Battle of Mogadishu, Somalia.
- 21 October – Landslides occurred in an abandoned open cast tin mine near Pantai Remis, Perak.
- 20 November – AirAsia, Malaysia's first low-cost carrier was established.
- 1 December – Dato Seri Anwar Ibrahim was appointed Deputy Prime Minister, replacing Tun Ghafar Baba.
- 11 December – Highland Towers collapse : Block A of Highland Towers apartments suddenly collapsed at 13:35 MST (UTC+8:00) in Hillview Park, Hulu Kelang, Selangor. 48 people died and two people survived. This incident became the deadliest structural failure in Malaysian history.
  - A witness was talking to friends after getting back from work, felt a shaking and suddenly a big rock rolled toward her. Another witnesses said she heard a loud noise like a "metal shot" at 1.30pm from the back of block A.
  - 124 members of the Federal Reserve Unit (FRU) and about 30 soldiers and engineers from the Batu Cantonment Camp and the Wardieburn Camp help aided the search and rescue. Hundreds of police, firefighters and rescue teams from Kuala Lumpur City Hall (DBKL), and PBSMM volunteers arrived early.
  - Rescue teams saw a stick of wood coming out of the rubble and begging. The maid of a condominium resident in Level 7, Umi Rashidah Khoruman, 22, and his son Nur Hamidah Najib, 18 months, were rescued. The two were the only survivors from the collapsed building.
  - Nakajima Shizue, a Japanese citizen was also rescued from the ruins but she died at the Kuala Lumpur Hospital (HKL) at 12 midnight. Dr Shahrum Abdul Wahid from HKL said Nakajima suffered severe bleeding.
  - Prime Minister Datuk Seri Dr Mahathir Mohamad, Deputy Prime Minister, Datuk Seri Anwar Ibrahim and many cabinet ministers visited the site.

== Births ==
- 12 January – Syahrul Azwari Ibrahim – Footballer
- 19 January – Muhammad Akram Mahinan – Footballer
- 22 January - Zhang Zetong - Born Malaysia, actor in Singapore
- 11 February – Zulfadli Zulkiffli – Badminton player
- 14 February – Mohd Farhan Abu Bakar – Footballer
- 2 March – Pandelela Rinong – Diver
- 26 April – Jupha Somnet – Cyclist
- 6 April – Nazirul Naim Che Hashim – Footballer
- 27 May – Khairulnizam Afendy – Sailor
- 20 September – Aedy Ashraf – Actor
- 24 October – Nabil Jeffri – Racing driver
- 18 November – Elizabeth Tan – Singer
- 19 November – Ooi Tze Liang – Diver
- 22 December – Muhammad Fazly Mazlan – Footballer

== Deaths ==
- 10 January – Raja Perempuan Zainab II of Kelantan, 6th Raja Permaisuri Agong of Malaysia (b. 1917).
- 19 February – Mohamed Hamzah, Architect of the Malaysian flag and field marshal (b. 1918).
- 29 June – P. Kalimuthu (Bentong Kali), criminal and gangster (b. 1961).
- 25 August – Wan Mohamed Wan Teh, 7th Menteri Besar of Perak (b. 1929).
- 4 October – Mat Aznan Awang, soldier (b. 1960).
- 22 November – Lee Loy Seng, businessman and philanthropist (b. 1921).

== See also ==
- 1993
- 1992 in Malaysia | 1994 in Malaysia
- History of Malaysia
