= 1988 in Malaysia =

- Decades: 1960s; 1970s; 1980s; 1990s; 2000s
- See also: Other events of 1988; History of Malaysia • Timeline • Years

This article lists important figures and events in Malaysian public affairs during the year 1988, together with births and deaths of notable Malaysians.

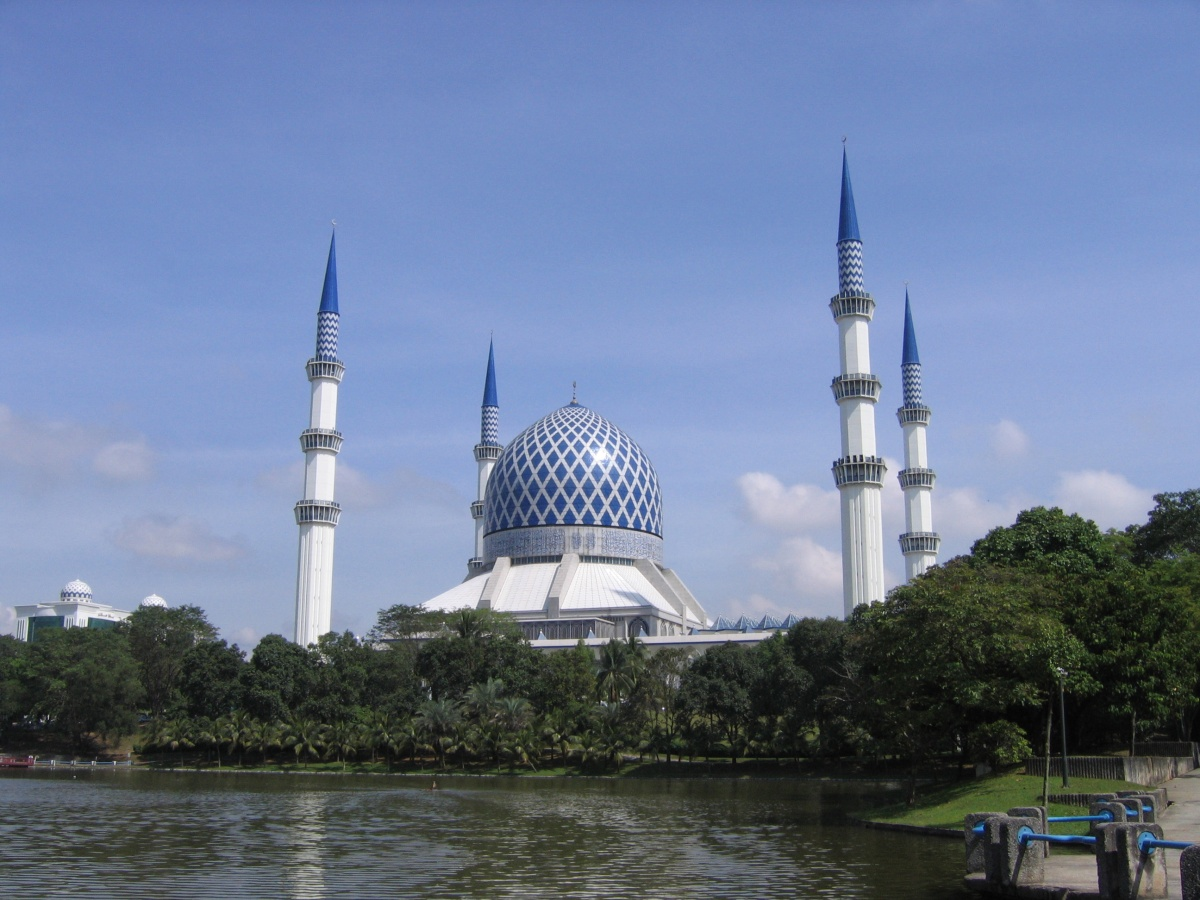
Sultan Salahuddin Abdul Aziz Mosque, Shah Alam, Selangor.

State flag of Sarawak, adopted on 16 September 1988.

State flag of Sabah, also adopted on 16 September 1988.

== Incumbent political figures ==
=== Federal level ===
- Yang di-Pertuan Agong: Sultan Iskandar
- Raja Permaisuri Agong: Sultanah Zanariah
- Prime Minister: Dato' Sri Dr Mahathir Mohamad
- Deputy Prime Minister: Dato' Ghafar Baba
- Lord President: Mohamed Salleh Abas then Abdul Hamid Omar

=== State level ===
- Sultan of Johor: Tunku Ibrahim Ismail (Regent)
- Sultan of Kedah: Sultan Abdul Halim Muadzam Shah
- Sultan of Kelantan: Sultan Ismail Petra
- Raja of Perlis: Tuanku Syed Putra
- Sultan of Perak:Sultan Azlan Shah (Deputy Yang di-Pertuan Agong)
- Sultan of Pahang: Sultan Ahmad Shah
- Sultan of Selangor: Sultan Salahuddin Abdul Aziz Shah
- Sultan of Terengganu: Sultan Mahmud Al-Muktafi Billah Shah
- Yang di-Pertuan Besar of Negeri Sembilan: Tuanku Jaafar
- Yang di-Pertua Negeri (Governor) of Penang: Tun Dr Awang Hassan
- Yang di-Pertua Negeri (Governor) of Malacca: Tun Syed Ahmad Al-Haj bin Syed Mahmud Shahabuddin
- Yang di-Pertua Negeri (Governor) of Sarawak: Tun Ahmad Zaidi Adruce Mohammed Noor
- Yang di-Pertua Negeri (Governor) of Sabah: Tun Said Keruak

== Events ==
- 4 February – UMNO was declared an illegal organisation by the High Court.
- 14 February – UMNO Baru was formed.
- 22 February – The longest hanging dragon in Malaysia was hung at The Mall, Kuala Lumpur during Chinese New Year to mark the Year of the Dragon.
- 1 March – Ipoh was granted city status.
- 11 March – The Sultan Salahuddin Abdul Aziz Mosque in Shah Alam, Selangor was fully constructed. This is the largest mosque in Malaysia.
- 13 May – The Highway Concessionnaires Berhad changed its name to Projek Lebuhraya Utara-Selatan (PLUS).
- 4 July – The Malaysian constitutional crisis ended.
- July – Opening of the Sultan Ismail Power Station in Paka, Terengganu, the largest power station in Malaysia.
- 31 July – Sultan Abdul Halim ferry terminal bridge collapse in Butterworth, Penang killed 32 and injured 1,674 people.
- 1 August – Kuching was granted city status. It comprises Kuching North and Kuching South.
- 29 August – The biggest Malaysian flag was hung in Angkasapuri and is the largest flag in this country ever hung to date.
- 16 September – Sarawak celebrated its 25th anniversary of independence within Malaysia.
- 21 November – Air France's supersonic Concorde made its first landing at Subang International Airport.
- 18 December – Footballer R Arumugam died in a car accident on Federal Highway near Petaling Jaya, Selangor.

== Births ==
- 5 January — Azizulhasni Awang — Track Cyclist
- 9 January – Anzalna Nasir – Actress
- 11 January – Rayzam Shah Wan Sofian – Athletics
- 28 March – Liyana Jasmay – Actress
- 23 April – Hairul Azreen – Actor
- 1 June - Jess Lee - Singer and songwriter
- 13 June – Shukri Yahaya – Actor
- 30 June – Alif Hadi – Actor and host
- 19 July - Shaukat (wrestler) - Professional and actor
- 30 July – Wen Chean Lim – rhythmic gymnast
- 15 August – Hazman Al-Idrus – Singer
- 25 October – Tiz Zaqyah – Actress
- 17 November – Durratun Nashihin Rosli – rhythmic gymnast
- 15 December – Idris Khan – Actor

== Deaths ==
- 17 March – Tun Tan Siew Sin – Minister of Commerce and Industry, Minister of Finance and MCA president
- 29 June – Tengku Ampuan Afzan of Pahang and 7th Raja Permaisuri Agong
- 22 August – Tun Henry H S Lee – First Finance Minister
- 18 December – R Arumugam – Footballer

== See also ==
- 1988
- 1987 in Malaysia | 1989 in Malaysia
- History of Malaysia
