= 1992 in Malaysia =

- Decades: 1970s; 1980s; 1990s; 2000s; 2010s
- See also: Other events of 1992; History of Malaysia • Timeline • Years

This article lists important figures and events in Malaysian public affairs during the year 1992, together with births and deaths of notable Malaysians.

== Incumbent political figures ==
=== Federal level ===
- Yang di-Pertuan Agong: Sultan Azlan Shah
- Raja Permaisuri Agong: Tuanku Bainun
- Prime Minister: Dato' Sri Dr Mahathir Mohamad
- Deputy Prime Minister: Dato' Ghafar Baba
- Lord President: Abdul Hamid Omar

=== State level ===
- Sultan of Johor: Sultan Iskandar
- Sultan of Kedah: Sultan Abdul Halim Muadzam Shah
- Sultan of Kelantan: Sultan Ismail Petra
- Raja of Perlis: Tuanku Syed Putra
- Sultan of Perak: Raja Nazrin Shah (Regent)
- Sultan of Pahang: Sultan Ahmad Shah
- Sultan of Selangor: Sultan Salahuddin Abdul Aziz Shah
- Sultan of Terengganu: Sultan Mahmud Al-Muktafi Billah Shah
- Yang di-Pertuan Besar of Negeri Sembilan: Tuanku Jaafar (Deputy Yang di-Pertuan Agong)
- Yang di-Pertua Negeri (Governor) of Penang: Tun Dr Hamdan Sheikh Tahir
- Yang di-Pertua Negeri (Governor) of Malacca: Tun Syed Ahmad Al-Haj bin Syed Mahmud Shahabuddin
- Yang di-Pertua Negeri (Governor) of Sarawak: Tun Ahmad Zaidi Adruce Mohammed Noor
- Yang di-Pertua Negeri (Governor) of Sabah: Tun Said Keruak

== Events ==
- 1 January – The Selangor Pewter Sdn Bhd company changes its name to Royal Selangor.
- 1 January – Jabatan Perkhidmatan Pos Malaysia is incorporated as Pos Malaysia Berhad.
- 22 February – Sudirman Arshad, popular singer and Asian No.1 Singer dies age 39 at his sister's house in Bangsar, Kuala Lumpur. His body is brought back to his hometown in Temerloh, Pahang and laid to rest at Chengal Muslim Cemetery.
- 16 March – The former Kuala Lumpur City Hall building in Jalan Raja, Kuala Lumpur is destroyed by fire.
- 17–19 April – 1992 Malaysian motorcycle Grand Prix
- 26 April–16 May – Rothmans 1992 Thomas & Uber Cup
- 16 May – Malaysia's men's badminton team wins the fifth Thomas Cup at Stadium Negara, Kuala Lumpur, beating Indonesia with the aggregate of 3–2.
- 17 May – The new slogan Malaysia Boleh is introduced.
- 20 June – 13 die in a tanker blast and 24-hour blaze at Port Klang, Selangor.
- 25 July–9 August – Malaysia competes at the 1992 Summer Olympics in Barcelona, Spain. In badminton, men's doubles players Razif Sidek and Jalani Sidek won their first ever Olympic medal at these Games.
- 15 August – Proton Saga Iswara launches.
- August – Kuala Lumpur is chosen as the host of the 1998 Commonwealth Games. It is the first time in history that a city in Asia has been chosen to host the Commonwealth Games.
- 23 August – The last horse race at the old Selangor Turf Club, Kuala Lumpur before the club moves to its new location at Sungai Besi.
- 29 September – The 1992 Peninsular Malaysia electricity blackout crisis.
- September – The groundbreaking ceremony for the National Sports Complex in Bukit Jalil.
- 15 October – A fire at the Subang Airport breaks out, six months after a major blaze had destroyed the South Wing of Terminal One in April.
- 30 November – Sultan Iskandar of Johor assaults Douglas Gomez, a hockey coach, leading to a media frenzy and the subsequent 1993 amendments to the Constitution of Malaysia.

== Births ==
- January 2 – Fadlan Hazim – Actor
- January 6 - Deen - Secret Figure
- March 17 – Ayda Jebat – Singer and actress
- March 27 – Emma Maembong – Actress
- June 21 – Mohd Ferris Danial – Footballer
- June 24 – Syafiq Kyle – Actor and model
- June 28 – Elizabeth Jimie – Diver
- July 17 – Mikail Andre – Actor
- August 28 – Ahmad Amsyar Azman – Diver
- September 27 – Izara Aishah – Actress
- November 4 – D. Saarvindran – Footballer
- November 12 – Lia Natalia – Actress and model
- November 13 – Jazeman Jaafar – Malaysian Formula BMW driver
- December 6 – Syed Saddiq, Malaysian politician and activist
- December 7 – Syafiq Yusof – Director and actor

== Deaths ==
- 1 February – Sim Kheng Hong, former Deputy Chief Minister of Sarawak (b. 1921).
- 22 February – Sudirman Arshad, popular Malay singer (b. 1954).
- 9 March – Kamaluddin Muhamad (Keris Mas), Malay author (b. 1922).
- 18 April – Tan Sri Abdul Kadir Yusof, former Minister of Law and Judiciary, 1st Attorney-General of Malaysia and Solicitor-General (b. 1917).
- 20 April – A. Rahim, actor (b. 1930).
- 13 May – Ishak Lotfi Omar, 13th Menteri Besar of Kelantan (b. 1917).
- 15 May – Noorizan Mohd Noor, actress and ex-wife of famous actor P. Ramlee (b. 1927).
- 27 June – Tengku Ampuan Rahimah of Selangor, Consort of Sultan Salahuddin Abdul Aziz Shah of Selangor (b. 1928).
- 6 August – Siti Tanjung Perak, actress (b. 1912).
- 28 August – Tan Sri Mohd Asri Muda, 14th Menteri Besar of Kelantan and 4th President of the Malaysian Islamic Party (b. 1923).

== See also ==
- 1992
- 1991 in Malaysia | 1993 in Malaysia
- History of Malaysia
