= 1991 in Malaysia =

- Decades: 1970s; 1980s; 1990s; 2000s; 2010s
- See also: Other events of 1991; History of Malaysia • Timeline • Years

This article lists important figures and events in Malaysian public affairs during the year 1991, together with births and deaths of notable Malaysians.

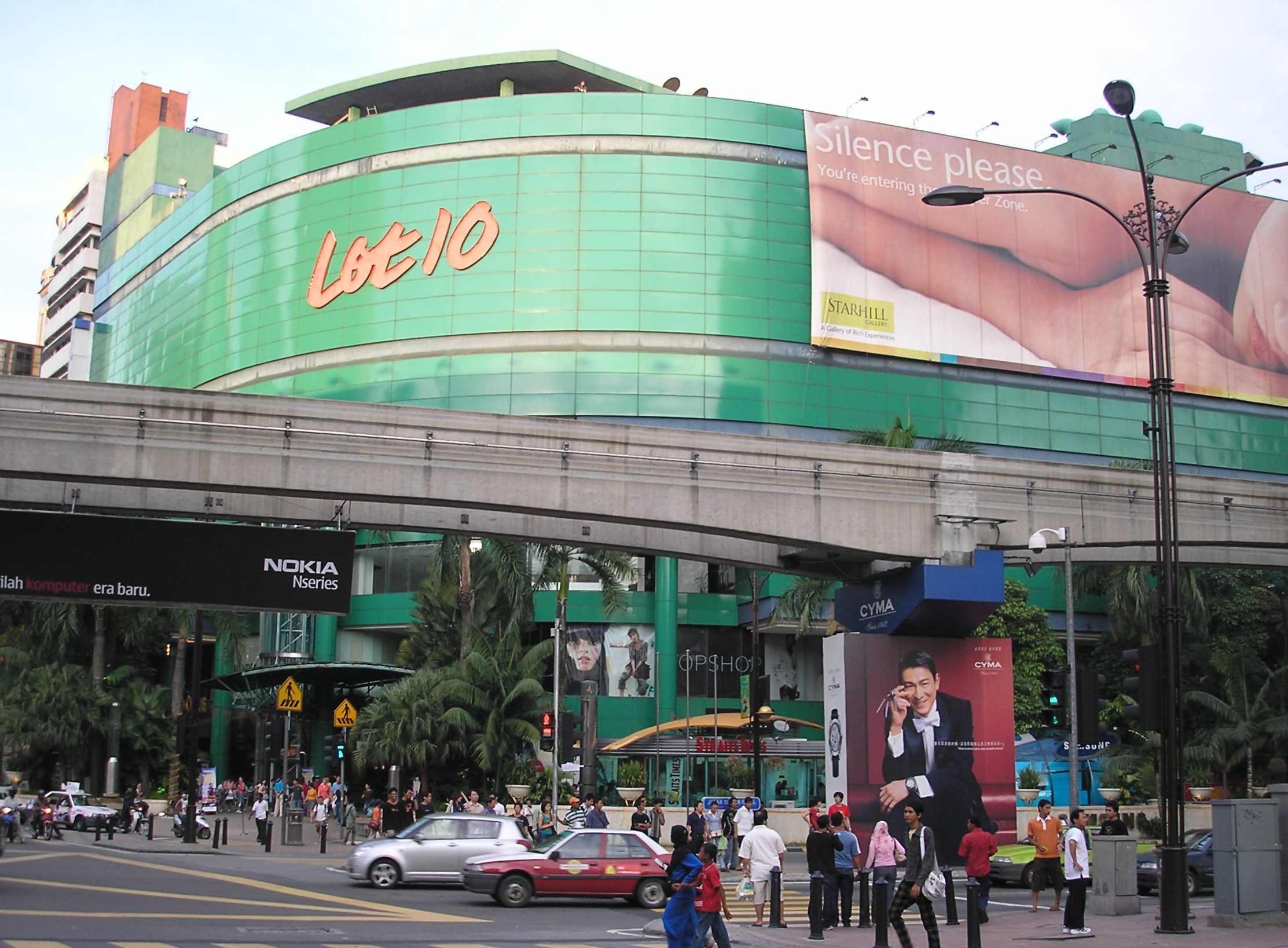
Lot 10 Kuala Lumpur shopping complex.

== Incumbent political figures ==
=== Federal level ===
- Yang di-Pertuan Agong: Sultan Azlan Shah
- Raja Permaisuri Agong: Tuanku Bainun
- Prime Minister: Dato' Sri Dr Mahathir Mohamad
- Deputy Prime Minister: Dato' Ghafar Baba
- Lord President: Abdul Hamid Omar

=== State level ===
- Sultan of Johor: Sultan Iskandar
- Sultan of Kedah: Sultan Abdul Halim Muadzam Shah
- Sultan of Kelantan: Sultan Ismail Petra
- Raja of Perlis: Tuanku Syed Putra
- Sultan of Perak: Raja Nazrin Shah (Regent)
- Sultan of Pahang: Sultan Ahmad Shah
- Sultan of Selangor: Sultan Salahuddin Abdul Aziz Shah
- Sultan of Terengganu: Sultan Mahmud Al-Muktafi Billah Shah
- Yang di-Pertuan Besar of Negeri Sembilan: Tuanku Jaafar (Deputy Yang di-Pertuan Agong)
- Yang di-Pertua Negeri (Governor) of Penang: Tun Dr Hamdan Sheikh Tahir
- Yang di-Pertua Negeri (Governor) of Malacca: Tun Syed Ahmad Al-Haj bin Syed Mahmud Shahabuddin
- Yang di-Pertua Negeri (Governor) of Sarawak: Tun Ahmad Zaidi Adruce Mohammed Noor
- Yang di-Pertua Negeri (Governor) of Sabah: Tun Said Keruak

== Events ==
- January – Keretapi Tanah Melayu (Malayan Railway) was incorporated as Keretapi Tanah Melayu Berhad (KTMB).
- February – UMNO party was brought it to state of Sabah by Deputy Prime Minister Tun Ghafar Baba.
- February – 1991 Malacca water crisis.
- 6 February – 1991 Selangor water crisis.
- March – The 1991 Malaysian haze affected Kuala Lumpur and Klang Valley.
- 7 March – The first Malaysian boat show opened in Port Klang, Selangor
- 7 May – The Bright Sparklers Fireworks Factory at Sungai Buloh, Selangor caught fire and caused a huge explosion that killed 29 and injured 83 people. It was Malaysia's worst industrial disaster to date.
- June – The New Economic Development Programme was launched.
- June – TV host for the Kelab Kanak-Kanak Angkasapuri, Intan Yusniza Mohamad Yunos and her foster mother were murdered.
- 1 August – The Lot 10 Kuala Lumpur shopping complex officially opened.
- August – The Vision 2020 (Wawasan 2020) programme was launched.
- 27–29 September – The first Malaysian motorcycle Grand Prix in Batu Tiga Circuit, Shah Alam, Selangor.
- October – The piling works for Kuala Lumpur Tower were completed.

== Births ==
- 21 January – Mohd Fadhli Mohd Shas – Malaysian defender
- 8 February – Syatilla Melvin – Actress and model
- 1 March – Misbun Ramdan Misbun – Badminton player
- 24 May – Iskandar Zulkarnain Zainuddin – Badminton player
- 9 September – Siti Adira Suhaimi – Singer
- 20 September – Khairul Anuar Mohamad – Archer
- 26 September – Mohd Fakhrurazi Musa – Footballer
- 20 October – Zulfahmi Khairuddin – Malaysian Grand Prix Motorcycle racer
- 12 November – Mohd Syukur Saidin – Footballer
- 14 November – Zubir Azmi – Footballer
- 22 November – Diana Danielle – Actress

== Deaths ==
- 11 July – Mokhtar Dahari – Malaysian footballer
- 6 September – Tan Sri Mohammad Noah – Politician and Minister of Home Affairs and Speaker of the Dewan Rakyat
- 7 November – Ishak Haji Muhammad (Pak Sako) – Malay author and nationalist

== See also ==
- 1991
- 1990 in Malaysia | 1992 in Malaysia
- History of Malaysia
