= 1989 in Malaysia =

- Decades: 1960s; 1970s; 1980s; 1990s; 2000s
- See also: Other events of 1989; History of Malaysia • Timeline • Years

This article lists important figures and events in Malaysian public affairs during the year 1989, together with births and deaths of notable Malaysians.

== Incumbent political figures ==
=== Federal level ===
- Yang di-Pertuan Agong:
  - Sultan Iskandar (until 25 April)
  - Sultan Azlan Shah (from 26 April)
- Raja Permaisuri Agong:
  - Sultanah Zanariah (until 25 April)
  - Tuanku Bainun (from 26 April)
- Prime Minister: Dato' Sri Dr Mahathir Mohamad
- Deputy Prime Minister: Dato' Ghafar Baba
- Lord President: Abdul Hamid Omar

=== State level ===
- Sultan of Johor: Tunku Ibrahim Ismail (Regent until 25 April)
- Sultan of Kedah: Sultan Abdul Halim Muadzam Shah
- Sultan of Kelantan: Sultan Ismail Petra
- Raja of Perlis: Tuanku Syed Putra
- Sultan of Perak: Raja Nazrin Shah (Regent from 26 April)
- Sultan of Pahang: Sultan Ahmad Shah
- Sultan of Selangor: Sultan Salahuddin Abdul Aziz Shah
- Sultan of Terengganu: Sultan Mahmud Al-Muktafi Billah Shah
- Yang di-Pertuan Besar of Negeri Sembilan: Tuanku Jaafar (Deputy Yang di-Pertuan Agong)
- Yang di-Pertua Negeri (Governor) of Penang:
  - Tun Dr Awang Hassan (until May)
  - Tun Dr Hamdan Sheikh Tahir (from May)
- Yang di-Pertua Negeri (Governor) of Malacca: Tun Syed Ahmad Al-Haj bin Syed Mahmud Shahabuddin
- Yang di-Pertua Negeri (Governor) of Sarawak: Tun Ahmad Zaidi Adruce Mohammed Noor
- Yang di-Pertua Negeri (Governor) of Sabah: Tun Said Keruak

== Events ==
- 19 January – Planetarium Sultan Iskandar in Kuching, Sarawak, the first planetarium in Malaysia was officially opened.
- 1 February – The Malaysian National Speed Limit was enforced.
- 19 February – A Boeing 747 owned by Flying Tiger Line crashed 12 kilometres from the Subang International Airport while on approach. The pilots misinterpreted the controller's instructions to descend, causing the aircraft to fly below minimum altitude and crash into a hillside on the outskirts of Puchong. The flight crew mistook the descent altitude to be 400 feet, when the controller actually meant 2400 feet. All four flight crew were killed.
- 8 March – Proton Saga Knight, the first Rally, Race, Research (R3) sports car was launched at Batu Tiga Circuit, Shah Alam.
- 19 March – Malaysian number one singer, Sudirman Arshad won the title " Best Performer" in the 1989 Salem Asian Music Awards at Royal Albert Hall, London, United Kingdom.
- 10 April – A bomb detonated at the Dayabumi Complex, Kuala Lumpur.
- 26 April – Sultan Azlan Shah of Perak was elected as the ninth Yang di-Pertuan Agong.
- 15 April – Malacca Town became a historical city and also a sister city of Kuala Lumpur.
- 15 May – Mahathir Mohamad left for a two-week official trip to the United States and Britain during which he met with US President George H. W. Bush and British Prime Minister Margaret Thatcher.
- 20–31 August – The Kuala Lumpur 1989, XV Southeast Asian Games.
- 16–30 September – The Malaysia Fest 1989 was held.
- 22 September – Around 27 students, mostly schoolgirls were killed in the Madrasah fire tragedy in Guar Chempedak, Kedah.
- 18
- 24 October – The 11th Commonwealth Heads of Government Meeting (CHOGM) was held in Kuala Lumpur.
- 2 December – The Communist insurgency in Malaysia (1968–89) ended and the Communist Party of Malaya (CPM) agreed to a ceasefire. The peace agreement was signed at Hat Yai, Thailand by the CPM, and the Malaysian and Thai governments. CPM was officially dissolved.
- 31 December – Dataran Merdeka (formerly Padang Kelab Selangor) was officially opened and the 1990 Visit Malaysia Year was launched.

== Births ==
- 17 January – Aiman Hakim Ridza – Singer and actor
- 29 January – Ong Jian Guo – Badminton player
- 10 February – Neelofa – Actress and television host
- 9 June – Faliq Auri – Saxophone player
- 18 September – Daniel Bego – Swimmer

== Deaths ==
- 12 January – Kamaruddin Mohamed Isa, 5th Menteri Besar of Perak (b. 1930).
- 17 February – S. Kadarisman, actor (b. 1922).
- 21 March – Chan Siang Sun, Minister for Health (b. 1933).
- 2 April – Ibu Zain, politician, nationalist and independence campaigner (b. 1903).
- 23 April – S. Sudarmaji, film director (b. 1923).
- 31 May – Chang Ling-Yun, Member of the Politburo of the Malayan Communist Party (b. 1921).
- 12 July – Tunku Abdul Rahman Sultan Ismail, Tunku Aris Bendahara of Johor (b. 1933).

== See also ==
- 1989
- 1988 in Malaysia | 1990 in Malaysia
- History of Malaysia
