= Lee Min =

Lee Min may refer to:

- Lee Meng (1926–2012), Malaysian Chinese communist guerrilla
- Lee Min-ho (born 1987), South Korean actor and singer who previously used the stage name Lee Min
- Min Lee (born 1995), Taiwanese professional golfer
