= Malaysian State Roads system =

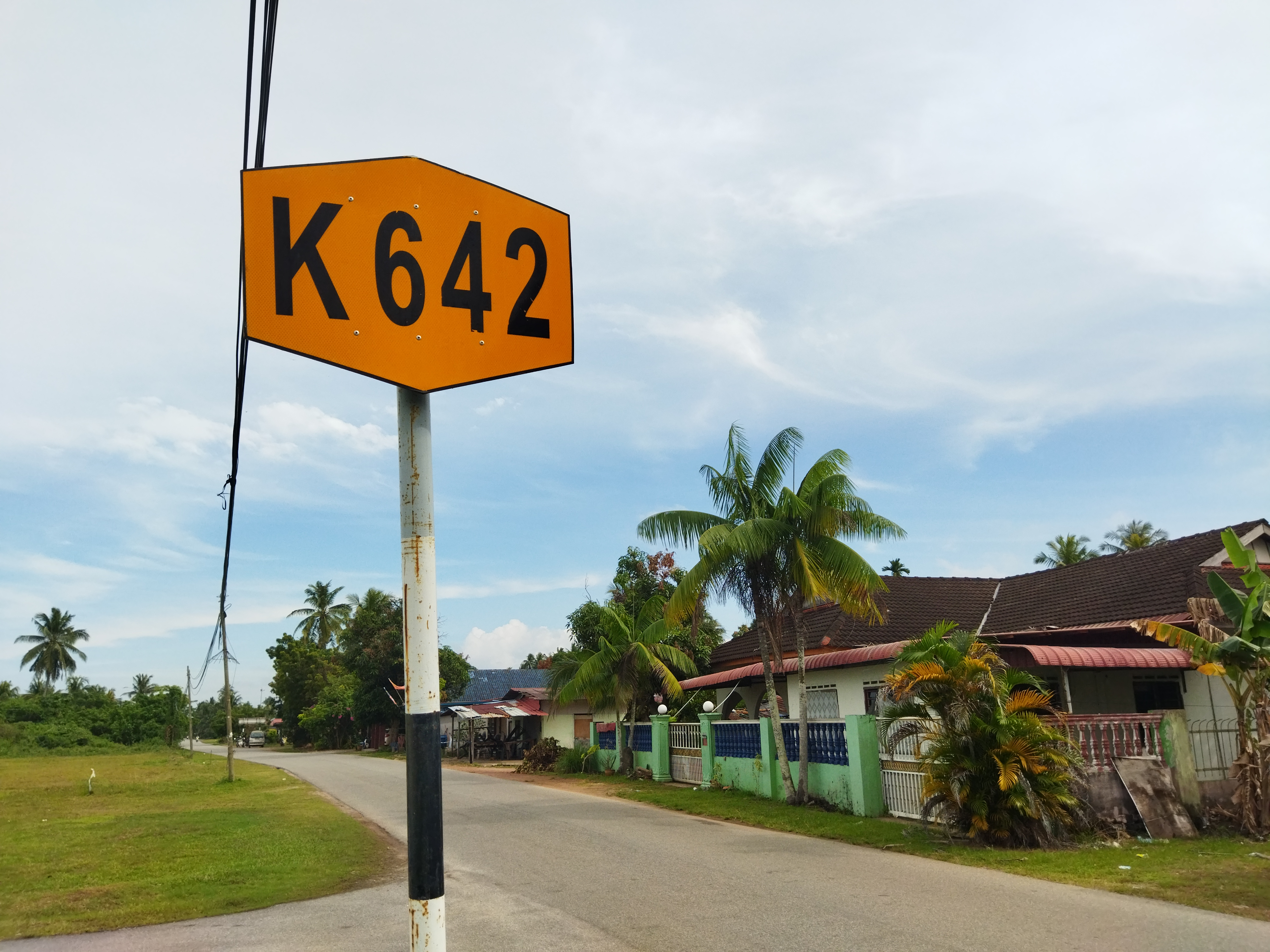
A state route code sign in Kedah.

The Malaysian state roads system (Malay: Sistem Laluan Negeri Malaysia; Chinese: 马来西亚州级公路系统) is made up of the secondary roads in Malaysia, with a total length of 264,906.73 km (as of December 2023). The construction and maintenance works of state roads in Malaysia is managed by Malaysian Public Works Department (JKR) of each state and funded by state governments. The standard of the state roads is similar to the federal roads except for the coding system, where the codes for state roads begin with state codes followed by route number, for example Johor State Route J32 is labeled as J32. If a state road crosses the state border, the state code will change, for example route B20 in Salak Tinggi, Selangor will change to N20 after crossing the border of Negeri Sembilan to Nilai (Both B20 and N20 now become Malaysia Federal Route 32).

== List of state codes in Malaysian state roads system ==
The codes assigned to each state is the same as those of the car number plates except for Sabah.

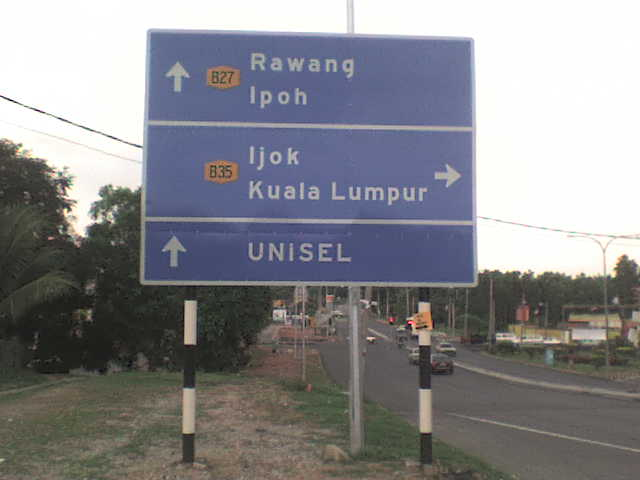
Common state road signboard in Malaysia at Bestari Jaya (previously known as Batang Berjuntai), Selangor.

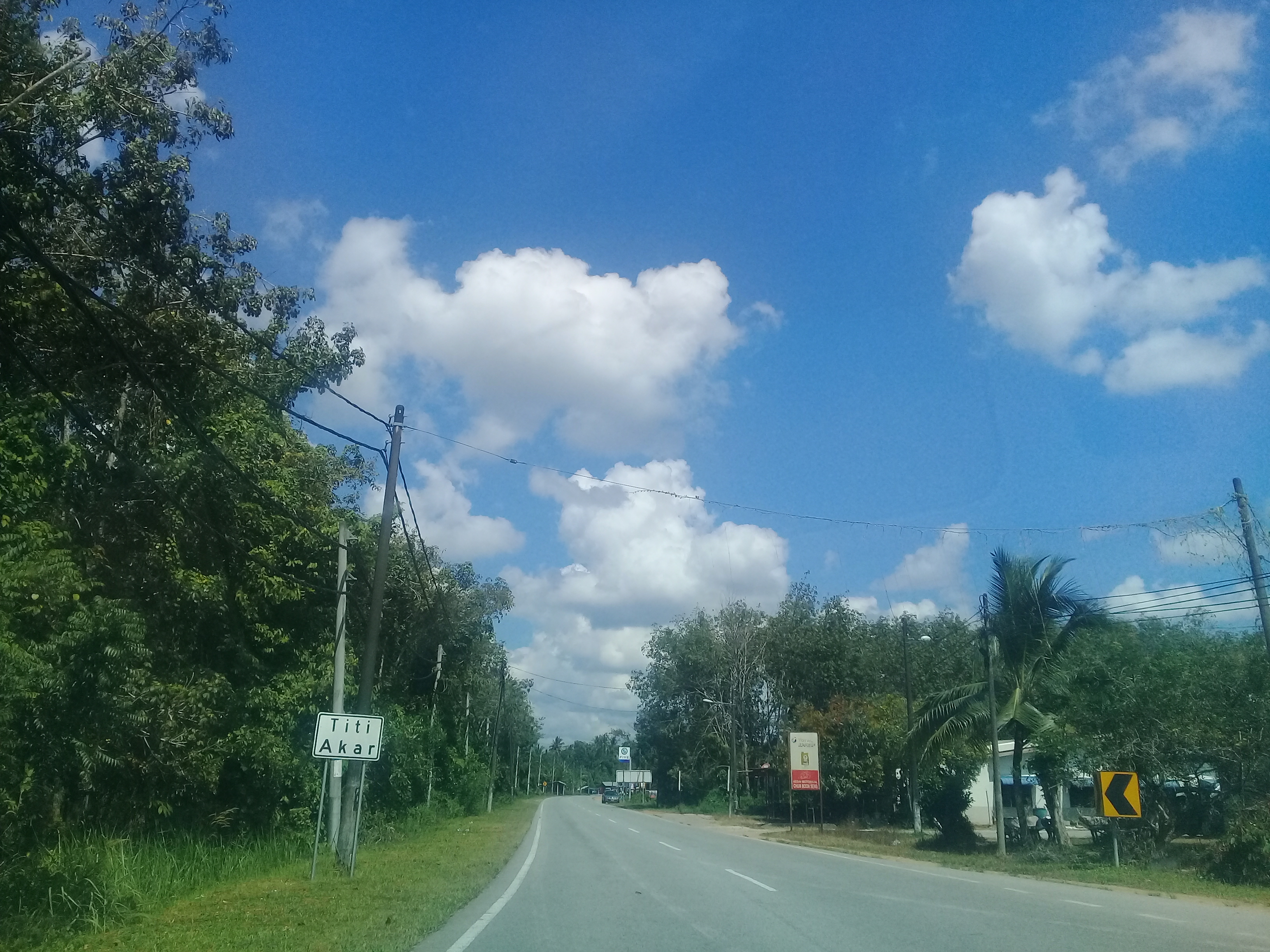
Jalan Kuala Ketil-Kuala Nerang (Central Spine Road; K17) near Titi Akar, Kedah.

- A: Perak
- B: Selangor
- C: Pahang
- D: Kelantan
- J: Johor
- K: Kedah
- M: Malacca
- N: Negeri Sembilan
- P: Penang
- Q: Sarawak
- R: Perlis
- SA: Sabah
- T: Terengganu
- W/V: Wilayah Persekutuan Kuala Lumpur (not used)

Note: Sarawak and Sabah use Route instead of State Route.

== Municipal roads ==
Municipal roads are usually not given a route number, as they are maintained mainly by the local councils. An exception is some major roads in Shah Alam, the capital of Selangor. For example, Persiaran Raja Muda in Shah Alam was given route number BSA-3.

== See also ==
- Road signs in Malaysia
- National Speed Limits
- Malaysian Expressway System
- Malaysian Federal Roads System
