= Syatilla Melvin =

Malaysian actress and model

- شتيلة ميلۏين
- Born: Siti Nur Syatilla binti Amirol Melvin; 8 February 1991 (age 35); Parit Buntar, Perak, Malaysia
- Occupations: Actress, model
- Years active: 2012–2018
- Spouse: Shaheizy Sam (m. 2016)
- Children: 3

Siti Nur Syatilla binti Amirol Melvin (born 8 February 1991) is a Malaysian actress and a model who debuted in 2012 and since then has acted in a few dramas and TV series.

== Early life ==
Syatilla or Tilla was born on 8 February 1991 and hails from Parit Buntar, Perak. She is the second child from five siblings. Her mother is Malay and her father is Japanese. Syatilla is the sister to the winner of the second season Gadis Melayu namely Siti Nur Syafiqah Amirol Melvin. After she finished her Sijil Pelajaran Malaysia SPM, she came to Kuala Lumpur to find a job.

She also a founder of club called MUFC, stands for Melvin United Fighting Club. Their Motto is "We Are the Gold Digger Kepamist". Their target is the get married to rich husband the they dumped them to get all his wealthy. Currently one of MUFC member are fighting to get a free house from his ex-husband. She also got strong support from Bob The MUFC Goal Keeper.

== Career ==
Syatilla debuted in 2012 and has acted in a few television dramas. The first drama she acted in was BFF (Best Friend Forever) which aired on TV3 in 2012. Her name become popular after only eight months being in the film industry. Her experiences as a model in many advertisements helped Syatilla develop her talent in acting. She is also a former finalist of Dewi Remaja in 2010.

In 2016, Syatilla starred in a drama Imam Mudaku Romantik as lead actress. The drama was broadcast on Astro Oasis and Astro Maya HD on 6 June 2016. The drama is also an adaptation from a novel which is using the same title.

Syatilla also will acting in drama Gondola Cinta Di Venice as Zulaikha which is as supporting cast. The drama will start broadcasting at TV2 in Selekta Prima (RTM) and airing on 7 June 2016.

== Personal life ==
Syatilla married Malaysian actor Shaheizy Sam on February 8, 2016. The couple have a son named Syeriv Samheizy Bin Shaheizy Sam born in 2017 and a daughter named Sarima Samheizy Binti Shaheizy Sam born in April 2019 .

== Filmography ==
=== TV series ===
Year	Title	Role	TV channel	Notes
2012	BFF Teman Tapi Mesra	Karmila	TV3	
2012	Bonda		TV3	
2012	Julia	Katrina	TV3	
2012	Esah Pajero	Nurul	TV3	
2012	Lara Hati	Jasmin	TV9	
2013	Dalam Setiap Sujud	Nita	TV9	
2013	Rindu Bertamu Di Abu Dhabi	Fifi	TV3	
2013	Kalau Bukan Aku	Nurin	TV3	
2013	Ramadan Yang Hilang	Delishah	TV3	
2014	Ariana Rose	Sophie	TV3	
2014	Aku Isterinya	Muzifa	TV3	
2014	Kifarah 2	Maisarah	TV3	Episode: "Panjang Tangan"
2014	Gerimis Salju Di Naminara	Mirah	TV2	
2015	Street Vendetta	Mira	TV2	
2015	Dan Hati Pun Berkata	Natrah	TV2	
2016	Kemboja Di Hati		TV Alhijrah	
2016	Sha & Shah	Sha	Astro Ria	
2016	Imam Mudaku Romantik	Laila Khalisah	Astro Oasis	
2016	Surah Buat Maisarah	Maisarah	TV3	
2016	Gondola Cinta Di Venice	Zulaikha	TV2	
2017	Cinta Samar	Juliana	TV1	
2017	Kerna Syurga Bukan Percuma	Adawiyah	Astro Oasis	
2018	Sunsilk #SISCUBA	Yasmin	TV3	
2018	Selafaz Cinta	Zahratul Jannah	Astro Prima	

=== Telemovie ===
Year	Title	Role	TV channel
2012	PA Cinta	Melissa	TV9
2012	Korban Haji	Zella	TV3
2013	Rentas Samudera	Leftenan Nor	TV2
2013	Tika Kau Tiada	Shima	TV1
2014	Ya Habibi	Fiona	TV2
2015	Chombee Anak Mamu	Chombee	TV2
2015	Aidil dan Adha	Nina	TV1
2015	Hijab Seorang Isteri	Farisya	TV1
