= Mohamed Hamzah =

Malaysian architect, designer of the flag of Malaysia

Mohamed bin Hamzah P.I.S. P.I.L. P.L.P.
- محمد بن حمزه
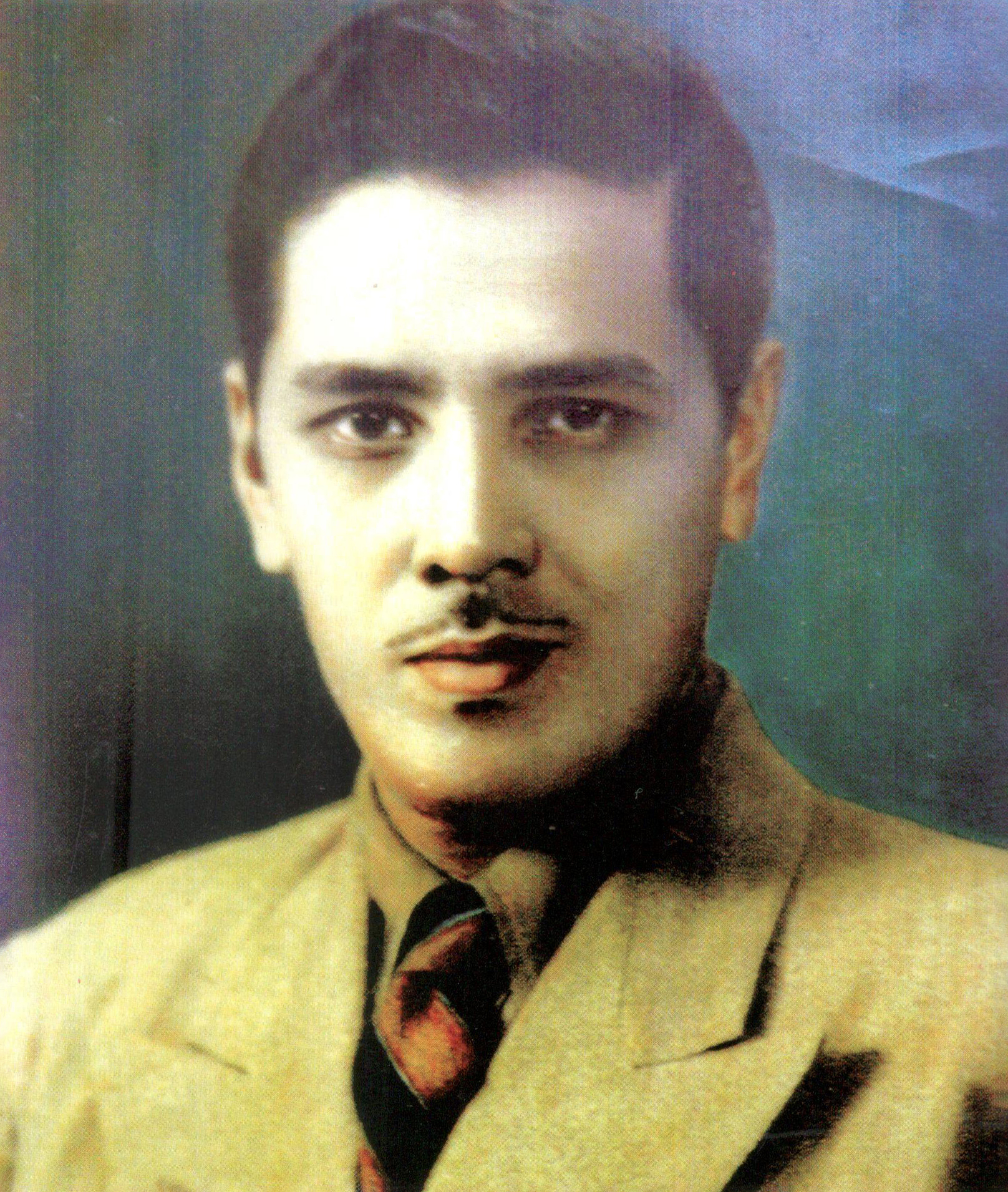
- Hamzah in 1971
- Born: 5 March 1918; KK Women's and Children's Hospital, Singapore, Straits Settlements
- Died: 19 February 1993 (aged 74); Kuala Lumpur, Malaysia
- Burial place: Tanah Perkuburan Islam Kebun Teh, Johor Bahru, Johor, Malaysia
- Education: Art
- Alma mater: Raffles College, Singapore, Straits Settlements
- Occupations: Architect; Soldier
- Known for: Designing the flag of Malaysia, Jalur Gemilang
- Spouses: Kamariah bte Alias; Nong Hashim; Rohaya; Robangi binti Daud
- Children: Mariam binti Mohamed
- Parents: Hamzah bin Abdullah (father); Aminah binti Haji Tahir (mother)
- Military service
- Allegiance: Malaysia
- Branch: Royal Johor Military Force
- Service years: 1939–1940s
- Unit: Infantry/Gendarmerie forces of Johor
- Conflicts: World War II (Pacific War)

Signature
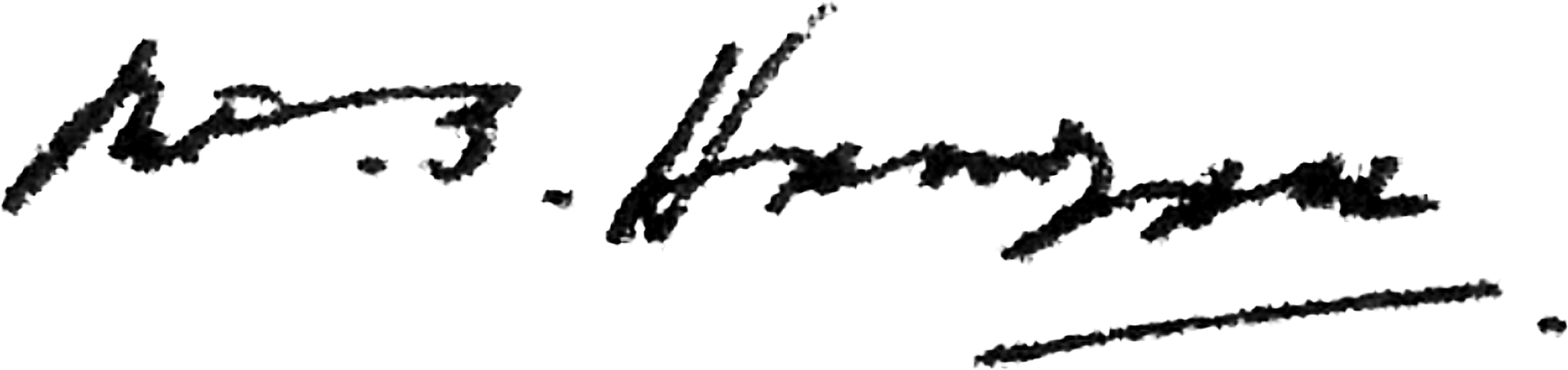

Mohamed bin Hamzah (Jawi: محمد بن حمزه; 5 March 1918 – 19 February 1993) was a Malaysian vexillographer, soldier and architect. He was the designer of the Jalur Gemilang, which is the current national flag of Malaysia.

He was most famous for his works in designing the Flag of Malaysia (formerly Malaya), the Jalur Gemilang, when the formation of the Federation of Malaya called for a new flag for the nation, to replace the short-lived Malayan Union flag. He was also known for designing Johor royal invitation cards and royal insignias, coat of arms of Johor, as well as buildings such as the Diamond Jubilee Hall in Johor.

== Personal life ==
Mohamed was born in the Kandang Kerbau Hospital in Singapore on 5 March 1918, and was the second of ten children. His family lived in Kampung Melayu Majidee, Johor Bahru, Johor.

He went to the Bukit Zahara Primary School, and later to the English College Johore Bahru. He also followed a postal art course from the Press Art School, Tudor Hall, Forest Hill, London. In 1936, he was sponsored by the government of Johor to resume his studies in art at the Raffles College, Singapore, Straits Settlements, before beginning his career later the year after as an engineer at the Public Works Department, Johor Bahru.

== Career ==
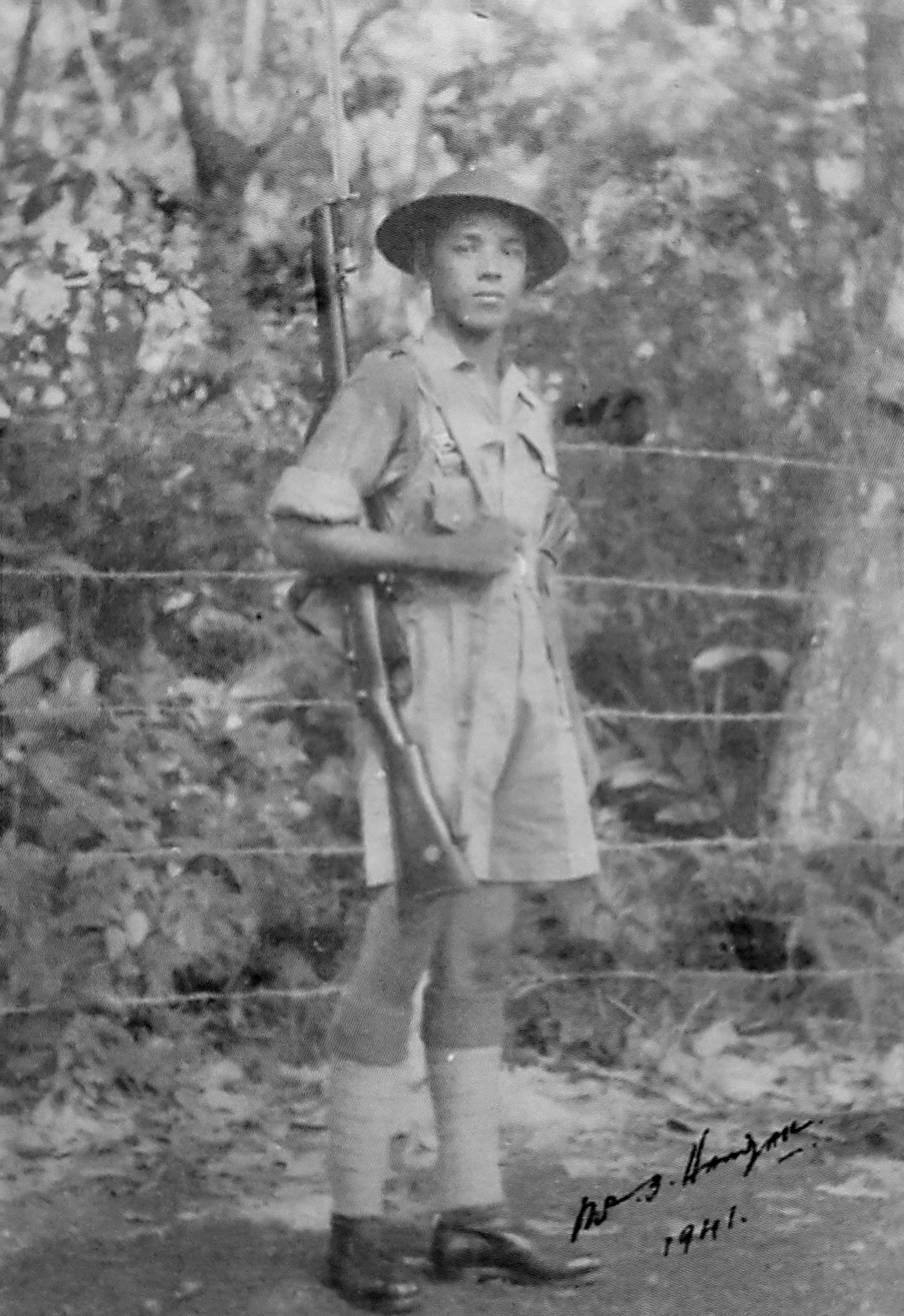
Mohamed as a soldier

In 1937, Mohamed began working as a tracer at the Engineering Unit of the Johor Bahru Public Works Department. He was later promoted to Technical Assistant, and later Highest Technical Assistant, where most of the works in Johor were handled by him.

In 1960, he was hired by Sultan Sir Ismail ibni Almarhum Sultan Sir Ibrahim Al-Masyhur to design the royal invitation card for his coronation on 10 February 1960. He was also tasked to draw the map for the Johor Coronation Grand Prix, design the Crown Arch at Lido Beach, as well as many other royal insignias and decorations for the coronation of Sultan Ismail.

He was then known to many as 'Mohamed Arkitek' (Malay for Mohamed the architect), as he was famous for designing structures such as the Diamond Jubilee Hall, Mahkota Tower, Mersing Jamek Mosque, Johor Bahru Post Office, Johor Bahru City Council Building, as well as many other government buildings, quarters, and mosques across Johor. He also designed the coat of arms of Johor, and the royal insignia for the royal family.

In the mid 1970s, the government of Johor offered Mohamed a contract work due to his outstanding work in the engineering field. He later worked at a furniture company in Johor Bahru as a furniture designer, and also designs logos for companies such as the iconic HABHAL (Haji Ahmad bin Haji Abdul Latif) soy sauce brand.

== Designing the flag of the Federation of Malaya ==
Mohamed's original flag design for the Federation of Malaya.

The final design of the flag of the Federation of Malaya after amendments were made.

When the Federation of Malaya replaced the short-lived Malayan Union, the federation government through the Federal Legislative Council called for a design competition for a new flag in 1949, eight years before the formation of the country. The council received 373 submissions, with only three being accepted and one of them being Mohamed's design, consisting of a field of stripes of blue and white, with a red canton containing a yellow crescent and five-pointed star.

According to Mohamed's youngest brother, Abu Bakar Hamzah, Mohamed who was 29 at that time decided to join the competition upon seeing its announcement, and was thrilled to be a part of the competition due to a burning patriotic passion and love for the nation. He sent four submissions, with only one of them ending up in the list of three finalists chosen by the government. The Federation Legislation Council later had public give their opinions regarding the three designs, as a local newspaper called The Malay Mail held a public poll for the matter. The results were later published on 28 November 1949, where the majority of the voters voted for Mohamed's design.

The then Menteri Besar of Johor, Dato' Onn Jaafar visited Mohamed at his home at Jalan Ungku Puan, Johor Bahru to discuss with him regarding the design of the flag. Onn suggested a few changes, including swapping the colours blue and red (to red and white stripes with a blue canton), as well as adding 6 more points to the 5-pointed star on the flag for a total of 11 points, since the nation was fighting against communist movements, and the 5-pointed star had an ironic resemblance towards the communists. After he agreed on the design amendments, the final design was submitted to the Conference of Rulers which during its conference on 22 and 23 February 1950, approved of the flag design. The flag was later flown for the first time at the Selangor Palace on 16 May 1950.

In 1963 when the Federation of Malaya turned into the greater Federation of Malaysia, the flag design was amended to accommodate three additional stripes and points to the star, signifying the three new states which joined the federation, Sabah, Sarawak, and Singapore. After Singapore's departure from Malaysia, the fourteenth stripe and point was dedicated to the federal government instead.

However, Mohamed told his brother Abu Bakar to keep it as a secret, that he was the person who designed the flag of Malaya.

== Death ==
On 19 February 1993, Mohamed passed away in Johor Bahru, Malaysia at the age of 74, upon suffering from asthma. His younger brother, Abu Bakar would later reveal after several years that Mohamed was the creator of the Jalur Gemilang flag, after seeing too many other people claiming it to be of their own or of others' creations. He sought help from the Public Works Department of Johor Bahru and the Johor Heritage Foundation (YWJ), who managed to find the proofs regarding Mohamed's contribution to the nation's flag, including an A4-sized tracing paper containing Mohamed's flag design with his signature. YWJ's Kamdi Kamil would later write a book honouring Mohamed's works, entitled "Mohamed Hamzah Perekacipta Jalur Gemilang: Bendera, Lambang & Lagu," published in 2007.

== Awards ==
=== Honours of Malaysia ===
- Johor
  - Sultan Ibrahim Diamond Jubilee Medal (1955)
  - Long Service Medal (P.L.P.) (1976)
  - Sultan Ibrahim Medal (P.I.S.) (1977)

=== Foreign Honours ===
- UK
  - Recipient of the Defence Medal
