= Alif Hadi =

Malaysian actor and TV host

- Born: 30 June 1988 (age 38); Kuala Lumpur, Malaysia
- Education: KDU College; Oxford Brookes University; HELP University College
- Occupations: Actor; TV Host; Professional Skateboarder; Brand Ambassador
- Years active: 2010–present
- Height: 5 ft 7 in (1.70 m)

Muhammad Alif bin Abdul Hadi is a Malaysian actor and TV host. He is also known as Alif Hadi. He made his debut on the reality show Fear Factor Selebriti Malaysia, Soon after, he starred in local dramas and telemovies such as Banglo Seksyen 2, Anak Patung, Syurga tanpa Cinta, Duda Terlajak Laris, Samudera Rindu, Dia Semanis Honey, Sayangku Kapten Mukhriz, Red Velvet and Angkara Cinta.

== Early life ==
Alif was born on 30 June 1988, in Kuala Lumpur, Malaysia. He is the second of two siblings. He lived in Kuang until 2002, then moved to Johor Bahru in 2003 before he then moved again to Shah Alam until the present day. He attended Sekolah Kebangsaan Kuang at primary level, then he continued his studies at Sri Bestari International School before he moved to Sekolah Menengah Kebangsaan Taman Perling 1. Upon finishing his secondary school, he then furthered his studies by taking PRE-Law course at KDU College which eventually continued his law path in taking the law degree LLB Hons. During his final year of his law degree, Alif then furthered his LLB (Hons) final year at the Oxford Brookes University, in Oxford, United Kingdom. Graduation from his LLB Law Degree, he began to realised that being a lawyer is not his cup of tea. He then continues furthering his studies by taking Master of Science in Economic Crime Management at the HELP University. Before debuting as an actor and TV Host, he was a part-time talent for TV Commercials and Printing Advertisements. He has been involved in advertising such as Brylcreem, Streamyx, Coca-Cola, Pizza Hut, Suzuki and many more.

== Career ==
=== 2006-present: skateboarding career ===
Apart from the entertainment career, Alif began his early career in sports as a professional skateboarder. He started skateboarding at the age of 14 in 2002. His development in skateboarding had flourished during his spell in the United Kingdom. Upon his return to Malaysia in 2010, he was sponsored by Ollie Cat Skateboards. After a few years winning several local competitions, in 2010, Alif was then sponsored by Hellbent Skateboarding and a year after that he was then sponsored by DC Shoes Malaysia. He was also at various times sponsored Crazeecausa, Lazca Skateshop and Glassy Sunhaters.

==== Achievements ====
Competition	Year	Placing
KL Tower Miniramp Competition	2007	3RD
Karnival Sukan Lasak & Kecergasan Selangor (BOWL OPEN)	2007	1ST
Karnival Ekstrem Piala Datuk Bandar (BOWL OPEN)	2010	3RD
Southern United 2011 Sesh (Game of SKATE)	2011	1ST
Southern United 2011 Sesh (Best Run)	2011	3RD
Converse Piknik Sabtu(Game of SKATE)	2012	3RD
October Crazeecausa Crazee on the Street (Game of SKATE)	2014	1ST
December Crazeecausa Crazee on the Street (Game of SKATE)	2014	3RD
Showroom Game of SKATE	2015	1ST
Fifty Fifty Skate Fest (Best Trick)	2015	2ND
Fifty Fifty Skate Fest (Best Run)	2015	3RD
Karnival Gen S (Game of SKATE)	2015	1ST
Crazeecausa Game of SKATE	2016	1ST
RIDE KL Game of SKATE	2016	3RD
Program Anak Muda Selangor Game of SKATE Raya	2016	1ST
Circa Mini Ramp Competition	2017	2ND
Melaka Laypark Republic Game Of SKATE	2018	1ST
Ram Jam Mini Ramp Competition	2018	1ST
Kobek Art Fest Mini Ramp Competition	2018	2ND

=== 2010-present: hosting and acting ===
In 2010, Alif had been offered to become a TV host for KRU TV under KRU Studios. His first baby project was a TV magazine titled 24-7 that was aired on Astro Ria and on Suria Media Corp. Singapore. In 2011, Alif was then offered to be the face of TVi RTM and also was chosen to become the host for Selamat Pagi Malaysia. In 2012, he participated in Fear Factor Selebriti Malaysia. During his participation on the reality show, controversy rises when Alif and his partner, Gambit Saifullah was deemed to be the villains on the show. Both of them was heavily criticised by the viewers after sparks a few tensions with other participants.

After Fear Factor Selebriti Malaysia, Alif began his acting career starring in his first drama Cornetto Kisah Chenta Uda dan Dara. He is still till this present day, active in acting and also hosting at the same time.

== Filmography ==
=== Film ===
Year	Title	Role
2018	Rumah Hantu Sakit Jiwa	Dr. Amin
2020	Bulan dan Pria Terhebat	Daud
2021	Janet: Sumpah Terlarang	Farid

=== Television series ===
Year	Title	Role	TV channel
2013	Cornetto Kisah Chenta Uda & Dara	Fariq	Astro Ria
2013	Impian L (Season 3)	Johan	TV1
2014	Anugerah Terindah	Hanif	TV3
2014	Syurga Tanpa Cinta	Faiz	TV1
2014	Super Game Boy The Series	Daus	Astro Ceria
2015	Ku Tinggalkan Cinta di Okinawa	Rizman	Astro Mustika HD
2015	Merah Gaun Pengantin	Ashraf	TV1
2015	Cinta Nasi Ambeng	Remy	TV1
2016	Duda Terlajak Laris	Fattah	TV3
2016	Dia Semanis Honey	Zaid	Astro Ria
2016	Sayangku Kapten Mukhriz	Shamsul Baharin	TV3
2016	Samudera Rindu	Ezaril	TV9
2017	Syahadat Cinta	Aidil Hasnol	TV2
2017	Rumah Kedai	Hakim	TV2
2017	Red Velvet	Daniyal	Astro Ria
2017	Cinta Hati Batu	Hezry	TV3
2018	Geng Tadarus	Ilham	TV2
2019	Senafas Rindu	Martin	Astro Ria
2019	Tolong Aku Doktor Cinta	Aspro	TV2
2019	Adam Cemphaka	Luqman	TV3
2019	Wasiat Dari Jordan	Ghuffran	TV2
2019	Misteri Mona	Shawn	TV3
2020	Angkara Cinta	Leo	Astro Prima
2021	Kisah Cinta Rumi	Jeremy	TV3
2021	The Hotel	Tengku Arif	Astro Ria

=== Telemovies ===
Year	Title	Role	TV channel
2013	Istikharah Cinta	Azwan	TV2
2013	Banglo Seksyen 2	Haris	Astro Ria
2013	Cinta Mat Semperit	Taha	TV3
2013	Penunggu Bayang (Super Telemovie)	Helmi	Astro Mustika HD
2013	Roti Bom Mak Tom	Azlan	TV2
2014	Anak Patung	Zaki	Astro Ria
2014	Aku Mahu Super Bibik	Adam	Astro Ceria
2014	5 Waktu	Zarif	Astro Oasis
2014	Chikiboom Raya	Alif	TV2
2015	Alim-Alim Kuching	Hisham	TV1
2015	Apabila Adam & Hawa Bertemu Salleh	Salleh	TV2
2017	Memori Pajeri Nenas	Rusdi	Astro First Exclusive
2017	Hidup Susah Mati Pun Susah	Zul	TV2
2018	Kerantung	Usman	TV1
2018	Ambon	Eddie	TV2
2018	Hantu Judi	Rizal	Astro Citra
2019	Misi Penculikan Cinta	Mika	TV3
2019	Rendang Buatan Timah	Rahmat	TV1
2019	Al-kisah Dua Roda	Roy	TV2
2019	Benua	Edan	TV2
2020	Cinta Semanis Bubble Tea	Zaim	TV2
2020	Kami Datang Nak Raya	Rahim	TV1
2020	Muruku Ikan Masin	Khairul	TV2

=== Television ===
Year	Title	Role	TV channel
2010	24-7	Host	Astro Ria
2011	Klik-i	Host	TVi
2011	Doktor Siber	Host	TVi
2012	Selamat Pagi Malaysia	Host	TV1
2012	Apa Nak Masak	Host	TV1
2013	Chikiboom	Host	TV2
2013	1Peluru	Host	TVi
2013	Music Ekstra	Host	TVi
2014	Santai-Santai Ke Johor	Host	TV1
2014	Makan-Makan @ Brunei	Host	Radio Television Brunei
2014	Rasa Sayang Aidilfitri	Host	TV2
2015	Juara Pujaan	Host	TV2
2015	Hidayah	Host	TV1
2016	Bintang Klasik Akhir	Host	TV2
2017	Terbaik Dari Ladang	Host	TV1
2017	Makan Di Mana	Host	TV Okey
2018	Terbaik Dari Ladang (Musim 2)	Host	TV1
2020	Etnik Kita	Host	TV1

=== Theatre ===
Year	Title	Role	Location
2016	Kuman	Fakir Adam	Old Parliament House (Singapore)

== Commercial and advertisement ==
Year	Title	Notes
2007	Brylcreem	TV Commercial
2007	Oldtown White Coffee	TV Commercial
2008	PLUS Highway PSA	TV Commercial
2009	Pizza Hut Hot Wings	TV Commercial
2010	Streamyx UNIpack	Print Advert
2011	Coca-Cola	TV Commercial
2012	Lenovo A1	Print Advert
2012	Suzuki Nex	TV Commercial
2013	Nikon D3200	Print Advert
2014	Nikon D3300	Print Advert
2018	Celcom CintaInsta	Website
2019	Minyak Buruh	TV
