= Malaysia Boleh =

Malaysian slogan

Malaysia Boleh (lit. 'Malaysia can do it') is a slogan originally used as a cheer in sports competitions, including the Commonwealth Games and Thomas Cup.

Its origin is unclear, but it is generally believed to come from a health beverage's slogan in the 1980s. It was popularized by the fourth Prime Minister of Malaysia, Mahathir Mohamad; in one speech, he applied it to Malaysia’s achievements in their education, economy and democracy.

It has become a patriotic slogan. It has also been used in an ironic, self-deprecating manner to comment on what the speaker perceives as Malaysia's flaws.
