= National Speed Limits (Malaysia) =

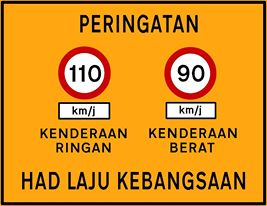
National speed limit reminder (Type 1)

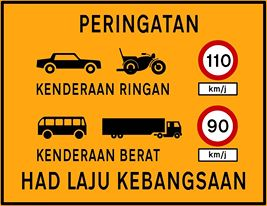
National speed limit reminder (Type 2)

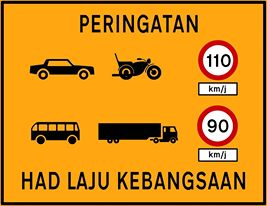
National speed limit reminder (Type 3)

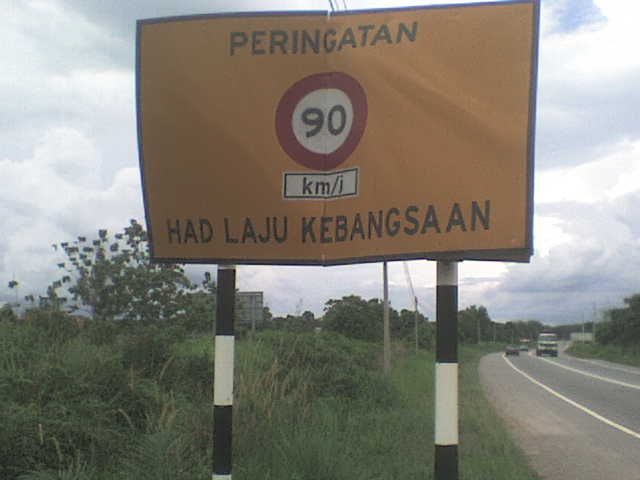
Speed limit sign in Malaysia until September 1998.

Had Laju Kebangsaan (National Speed Limits) is a set of speed limits applicable on Malaysian expressways, federal roads, state roads and municipal roads. The National Speed Limits was enforced on 1 February 1989 following the National Speed Limit Orders 1989 (Perintah Had Laju Kebangsaan 1989). Like any other countries in the world, failing to obey the speed limit on Malaysian roads and expressways is an offence as subject to Malaysian Road Safety Act 1987, which can be fined up to RM300, depending on the difference between the speed limit and the driven speed.

== Default speed limits ==
- Expressways: 110 km/h (68 mph) by default, but may be reduced to 80–90 km/h (50–56 mph) at dangerous mountainous stretches, crosswind areas and urban areas with high traffic capacity.
- Federal roads: 90 km/h (56 mph) by default (reduced to 80 km/h (50 mph) during festive seasons), 60 km/h (37 mph) in town area.
- State roads: 90 km/h (56 mph) by default (reduced to 80 km/h (50 mph) during festive seasons), 60 km/h (37 mph) in town area.

== Speed limits for heavy vehicles ==
Special speed limits are applied to heavy vehicles, and all heavy vehicles have speed limit stickers describing the allowed speed limits. However, many heavy vehicles especially express buses do not obey these speed limits.

The speed limits for heavy vehicles are as follows:-

- Expressways: 80–90 km/h (50–56 mph)
- Federal and state roads: 70–80 km/h (43–50 mph) by default, 60 km/h (37 mph) in urban areas

== Other speed limits ==
For school areas, the speed limit of 35 km/h (22 mph) is applicable during rush hours. Besides, cars with trailers apply the same speed limit as heavier vehicles (80 km/h (50 mph) on expressways and 80 km/h (50 mph) on other roads).

Starting from the 2006 Hari Raya Aidilfitri, the Malaysian Police began enforcing lower speed limits during festive seasons for all federal and state roads, from the default 90 km/h (56 mph) down to 80 km/h (50 mph).

== Speed penalties ==
Speeding over the enforced speed limits can be fined up to RM300 and offenders may also receive demerit points as subject to KEJARA System by Malaysian Road Transport Department.

The speed penalties are given according to the difference of the driven speed and the enforced speed limit as follows:-

1. 1 ~ 25 km/h: RM80 (6 demerit points)
2. 26 ~ 40 km/h: RM150 (8 demerit points)
3. Over 40 km/h: RM300 (10 demerit points)

== Speed limit issues ==
=== Higher speed limit on expressways (130 km/h) ===
In 1991, a proposal to increase the speed limit on Malaysian expressways to 140 km/h (87 mph) was made but was finally rejected in 2005 by Minister of Works, Datuk Seri S. Samy Vellu, stating that most drivers often drive 10 to 30 km/h faster than the stated speed limit on the expressways.

Over the years, several attempts to set higher speed limit for the expressways were being made by certain quarter of the public. However, each attempt was successfully turn-down citing safety as one of the main reason for the rejection. On the basis of fatality per 100 km length of road, Malaysian expressways recorded more than three times higher number of fatality when compared to that of the federal roads.

=== Lower speed limit during festive seasons (80 km/h) ===
Starting from the 2006 Hari Raya Aidilfitri festive season, the Malaysian police enforced lower speed limits on federal and state roads during festive seasons, from the default 90 km/h (56 mph) to 80 km/h (50 mph) as a preventive measures to reduce accidents during festive seasons. However, many road users complain about the viability of the lower speed limit because the accident rate during festive seasons continue to rise even with lower speed limits, as the lower speed limit doesn't seem to bring any significant effects of reducing the accident rate; therefore, lower speed limit alone is not the effective deterrent of fatal accidents during festive seasons.

== See also ==
- Speed limit
- Speed limits by country
- Speed trap
- Malaysian Expressway System
- Malaysian Federal Roads System
- Malaysian State Roads system
