= Baling Talks =

1955 diplomatic conference to resolve the Malayan Emergency

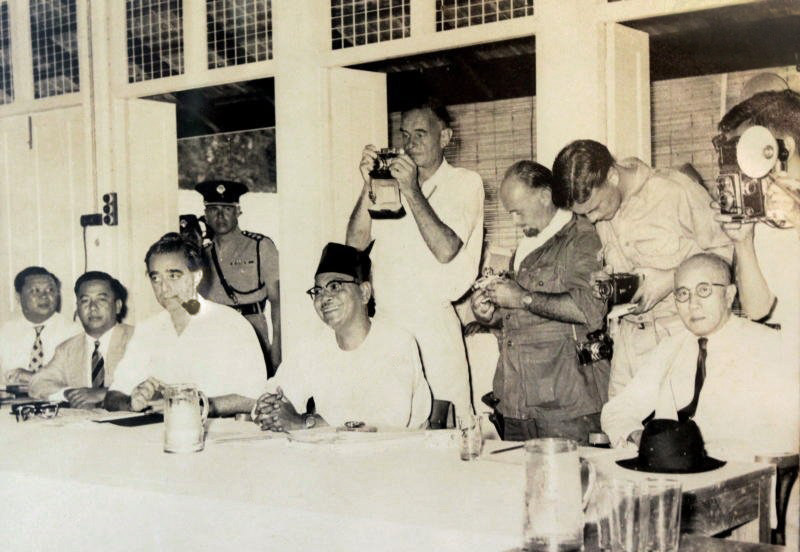
Those involved in the talks, from left – David Marshall, Tunku Abdul Rahman & Tun Tan Cheng Lock.

The Baling Talks were held in northern Malaya on 28 and 29 December 1955 in an attempt to resolve the Malayan Emergency.

The main participants were Tunku Abdul Rahman (representing the Government of the Federation of Malaya), David Marshall (representing the Crown Colony of Singapore), and Chin Peng (representing the Malayan Communist Party). The talks were unsuccessful because the surrender terms were not acceptable to the Malayan Communist Party. After the talks, Chin Peng retired to Thailand and Ah Hai replaced him as acting Secretary-General in Malaya.

== Background ==
The Malayan Emergency refers to a state of emergency declared by the British colonial government of Malaya in 1948 and lasted until 1960. There was an insurrection, and guerrilla war was fought between government forces and the Malayan National Liberation Army (MNLA) during the period. The state of emergency entailed the revocation of many civil rights, the granting of special powers to the police, and other measures. He then mentioned the High Commissioner's announcement in the Legislative Council on 30 November that the British Government no longer considered "the Continuation of the Emergency" as "an obstacle to the Federation's advance to self-government" aimed at the suppression of left wing political movements, especially the Malayan Communist Party (MCP).

On 8 September 1955, the Government of the Federation of Malaya issued a declaration of amnesty to the Communists. The Government of Singapore issued an identical offer at the same time. However, few Communists surrendered to the authorities. It was evident that the Communists, having had ample warning of its declaration, conducted intensive anti-amnesty propaganda in their ranks; among the mass organisations, discipline was tightened and defectors were threatened with severe punishment.

Realizing that his struggles had not come to any fruition, Chin Peng proposed a referendum to the ruling British government alongside many Malayan officials in 1955. The meeting was intended to pursue a mutual end to the conflict but the Malayan government representatives, led by Tunku Abdul Rahman, dismissed all of Chin Peng's demands. As a result, the conflict heightened and, in response, New Zealand sent NZSAS soldiers, No. 14 Squadron RNZAF and later No. 75 Squadron RNZAF; and other Commonwealth members also sent troops to aid the British.

== Events prior to the talks ==
=== Government proposal ===
On being elected as the new President of UMNO in 1951, Tunku Abdul Rahman announced to his supporters his determination to achieve very early self-government in Malaya. However, for as long as the Communist threat persisted, the Tunku believed that the British government would not grant self-government to Malaya. The Tunku's interpretation was based on the British Government directive to Sir Gerald Templer, on his appointment as the new High Commissioner for Malaya in 1951, which stated that "Her Majesty's Government would not lay aside the responsibility in Malaya until they are satisfied that Communist Terrorism has been defeated". The termination of the Emergency was the first priority of the Alliance, and it had to attempt every means possible to achieve it.

It was to this end that, in early January 1955, the Tunku made a dramatic call for the granting of an amnesty to the Communists as part of a deal to bring to an end the state of emergency in Malaya. The Tunku's proposal envisaged that, since a more truly national form of government was about to be introduced into the Federation, the Communists could no longer assert that they were fighting against British Imperialism and would be ready to give up the struggle. His proposal contemplated the granting of amnesty and the intensification of the campaign against the Communists if the amnesty was rejected. Dato' Seri Tan Cheng Lock, then-President of the Malayan Chinese Association (MCA) echoed the Tunku's sentiment, and even went so far as to publicly volunteer to go into the jungle to negotiate with the Communists.

The public response to the Tunku's proposal was favourable for it gave hope that it would lead to an end of militant communism and relieve the country of the heavy financial commitment of waging the emergency campaign. Moreover, it coincided with the amnesty offered to the Mau Mau terrorists in Kenya, which was announced some weeks earlier, which stimulated the public interest in the prospects of a similar amnesty in Malaya.

On 12 January 1955, a meeting of the UMNO-MCA Alliance was held in Malacca to discuss the Tunku's amnesty proposal. The meeting decided to "ask the Federation Government to offer amnesty terms to the Communist terrorists". The Committee decision was that "terrorists accepting the amnesty should be sent back to People's Republic of China or be rehabilitated and allowed to remain good citizens".

The Tunku's proposal was looked at askance by the British authorities. The British did not believe that, under the circumstances in January 1955, the offer of an amnesty would be likely to entice the Communists to surrender en-bloc, than their current policy of encouraging the terrorists to surrender individually, in the understanding that they would be fairly and humanely treated.

There was also the major issue in which any amnesty offer would not be available indefinitely. There was a fear that the ending of the amnesty period would discourage further surrenders, until confidence was again built up in the treatment of surrendered Communists under normal conditions.

In a telegram to the Secretary of State for the Colonies, the High Commissioner, Sir Donald MacGillivray, noted that:

This would be unfortunate, particularly as we see nothing in the present situation which would support the belief that an offer of amnesty at this juncture would be likely to be successful.

On 11 January 1955, Tunku Abdul Rahman met the Director of Operations, Lt. General Sir Geoffrey Bourne, in connection with the amnesty proposal. The Tunku stated that his objective was not so much that the MCP would accept an offer of amnesty, but to convince the people of Malaya that everything possible was being done. For him, a greater degree of mobilisation will not be possible until after that year's elections. He was aware that any direct negotiation with the Communists was out of the question. He stressed that it would not be acceptable for the Communists Party to be allowed to operate legally.

The proposal was further discussed on 17 January by the Director of Operations Committee, which comprised not only the Director of Operations and his Service Advisers, but a number of political leaders. The Alliance was represented by Tunku Abdul Rahman and H.S. Lee. The Tunku was asked by the Committee to clarify his amnesty proposal and the eight-point arrangements for an amnesty as proposed by the UMNO-MCA Alliance meeting at Malacca. After the discussion, it was appreciated by the Tunku and H.S. Lee that an amnesty will not be an armistice - something to be negotiated separately with the Communists' leaders - but will be a standing offer of pardon for each individual terrorist. It was also agreed that the amnesty question should not become a party matter.

Further publicity about the amnesty was also considered to be undesirable as it would adversely affect conduct of the campaign to encourage the Communists to surrender to the Government. Furthermore, the Communists leaders themselves, in their clandestine news-letter, condemned the Alliance's proposal as a British intrigue, designed to cause dissension in the Malayan Communist Party and to isolate it from public support. The Tunku consented to drop the proposal. Both accordingly welcomed a suggestion that a working party should be set up to examine all the implications of an amnesty. The findings were to be recorded for the information of the Director of Operations Committee. The composition of the working party was to be as follows: the principal Staff Officer to the Director of Operations, Secretary for Defence, a representative of the Attorney-General, Tunku Abdul Rahman, H.S Lee of the Malayan Chinese Association and V.M. Menon of Party Negara. After the meeting, the following press release was issued:

The question of an amnesty was very fully discussed in every respect at the Director of Operations Committee today. It was unanimously agreed that a general amnesty should not be offered, but that the present surrender policy, which embodies a very considerable measure of amnesty should continue, and increased efforts should be exerted to bring it to the notice of the rank and file of the terrorists, so that more may be induced to follow the lead of the 1,500 who have already surrendered. It was also agreed that the matter should be kept constantly under review so that policy could be modified if it should appear at any time that a break up of the terrorist organisation could be hastened by a greater or lesser measure of amnesty.

The rejection by the Federal Government of the Alliance's proposal for an amnesty was strongly supported by the Manchester Guardian, a British newspaper. In its editorial, the newspaper commented that an amnesty was appropriate when rebels had lost the desire to continue the struggle with the Government, and in return for the act of oblivion, were willing to become law-abiding citizens again. However, this was not the case in Malaya. The active members of the MCP would accept the amnesty only if they felt that afterwards they would be in a stronger position in their struggle against the Government. The form of amnesty which was proposed by the Alliance seemed to envisage that the Communists would maintain their party organisation intact and would turn their acts of guerrilla warfare to electioneering in a constitutional way.

The Tunku however was not prepared to give way lightly to the shelving of his proposals and the Alliance restated its view on the question of an amnesty in its Election Manifesto issues in May 1955. The Manifesto contained an undertaking to offer a general amnesty to the Communists in the following terms:

... to end the emergency as soon as possible by offering a general amnesty and, if it fails, to mobilise all our resources and seek all foreign aid to increase the vigour and intensify the fight against the terrorists.

=== The Communists' counter offer ===
A month before the election, with the country increasingly gripped with political fever, the Malayan Communist Party took the initiative by putting forward a counter-offer to enter into negotiations for the termination of hostilities. The offer was contained in a letter written in Chinese, copies of which were sent to a number of leading personalities and organisations in the Federation of Malaya and in Singapore. The letter was signed by a representative of the Malayan National Liberation Army and dated 1 May, and had been posted in Haadyai in Southern Thailand. None of these letters were sent direct to the High Commissioner or to any of his officers. The letter asked a safe conduct to enable representatives of the Headquarters of the Communists terrorists to come out to negotiate both a ceasefire and the participation of the Communist Party in the future development of the country. The letter also rejected the Alliance's amnesty offer.

The imminence of the Federal elections probably explained why the MCP chose to make their offer at that particular time. Furthermore, the offer was consistent with the then International Communist policy of turning away from armed struggle to expansion by political means. At the second Conference of the Communist and Workers' Parties of the British Commonwealth, held in London in April 1954, a report entitled Malaya Fights for Freedom had been submitted by the exiled Lim Hong Bee that favoured, among other things, a provisional coalition People's government formed by all patriotic parties to achieve full national independence. In August 1954 a Malayan delegate to the Council of World Democratic Youth in Peking was quoted as saying "... they are willing to undertake peace talks to bring the Malayan war to an end..."

By November 1954 a guerrilla newssheet produced in the Kedah/Penang area carried this report together with approval of the Geneva Conference on Indochina as an example of "how disputes can be solved justly by peaceful means". The British in Malaya were specifically urged to follow the French example in Indochina.

The MCP's counter-proposal was discussed both by the Executive Council and the Director of Operations Committee. At this meeting, which was attended by Tunku Abdul Rahman and other leaders, a unanimous decision was made to reject the MCP's proposal. In a statement issued by the Federation Government on 24 June 1955, the Government made it clear that the present surrender terms were a real and continuing measure of amnesty and made adequate provisions for those fighting in the jungle to come out if they wished to do so. The Government believed that the terrorist leaders in Malaya had their own considerations to call off the war. It was thought that MCP leaders realised that they were slowly and steadily losing ground to the Security Forces and wished to concentrate their main efforts on subversion. For that purpose it was essential to them that the trained cadres should emerge from the jungle and instead organise subversive activities in the urban areas. The proposal for amnesty talks put forward by the Alliance in January was hence unacceptable to the Communist leaders because it did not seem to allow them to roam at will in the Federation; instead they were facing prospects of either a long period in detention, or deportation to the People's Republic of China.

Reactions to this refusal by the Government were varied. The rejection was supported by the Alliance and Parti Negara. The Labour Party of Malaya, however, expressed the view that the rejection was in haste and that the offer should have been more further examined. Among the Chinese newspapers, only the Nanyang Siang Pau had questioned the wisdom of the Government's rejection. This paper argued that the offer was worthy of closer attention than it had received and that nothing would have been lost by meeting the Communists at the table to test their sincerity. The other Chinese newspapers, particularly those with a KMT or Chinese Nationalist background, strongly supported the Government's rejection and described the peace offer as a manoeuvre to bring about the relaxation of military pressure which would facilitate the infiltration.

Having rejected the Communist's proposal, the Director of the Operations Committee thought that it would be necessary to take a positive step to show that the government was doing everything in its power to end the emergency. The Committee, which discussed the matter at a series of meetings held in June and July, decided to offer an amnesty to the Communists. The Committee was of the opinion that such an offer would be a timely counter-move by the Federation Government to offset the propaganda value of the Communists' counter-proposal and to convince fence-sitters that the Government was not seeking to prolong the Emergency, but to end it. Even if the hard core leaders do not respond, it was expected that large numbers of the rank-and-file might take advantage of the amnesty to give themselves up and escape from the privations of jungle life, thus inducing a split between the leaders and the rank-and-file. An all-out campaign such as leaflets and loudspeakers was thought to be necessary to bring the offer to the attention of the terrorists.

The Committee also took into consideration the declaration made by the Alliance in their Election Manifesto that, if they were successful at the Elections, they would declare an amnesty. Since the expectations were that the Alliance would be the major party, it was clearly prudent that some thoughts should be given in advance to the ways to which an amnesty offer might be made. If the Government opposed the granting of an amnesty it would play into the hands of the Communists for propaganda purposes.

The only objection to granting an amnesty, according to the Committee, was that it would have a deadline. Once the deadline lapsed, the remaining terrorists will be less willing to surrender, until confidence could be built up again.

The Director of Operations Committee concluded, however, that the advantages of offering an amnesty outweighed the possible risks and difficulties, and that the offer would carry particular weight if it were made by the new Government soon after the elections.

To this end, the Committee began to draft the wording of the amnesty terms. Malcolm MacDonald, the British Commissioner-General for Southeast Asia, suggested that the terms should be designed to appeal to the rank-and-file terrorists who, not being hardcore Communists, had been intimidated by the Communists into taking up arms and having done so, had been forced to stay in the jungle. Though those who surrender would not be prosecuted, they would be required to demonstrate their loyalty to the Government before they would be allowed to return to their families. The amnesty involved neither negotiation with the Communists nor recognition of the MCP.

The British Ministry of Defence was also involved in drafting the terms. The Ministry considered that the point to be stressed was that Communists who surrendered would not be shot, but that no hope should be held out that they would escape detention. Furthermore, it added that, it was essential that hard core Communists should be detained for some time, as it was believed if they were released into society, they would cause further trouble in Malaya and if they were deported, they would cause trouble in Southeast Asia. The Ministry thought that the amnesty terms should not include any reference to the possibility of helping a Communist who surrendered to leave the country. It was also suggested that the idea of a deadline be dropped.

== The talks ==
The talks commenced in the Government English School (now as Sekolah Kebangsaan Tunku Putera) near Baling town in southeastern Kedah state, in northern Malaya, on 28 December 1955. They lasted more than eight hours, and were spread over two days. The MCP was represented by Chin Peng, the Secretary-General, Rashid Maidin and Chen Tien, head of the MCP's Central Propaganda Department. On the other side were three elected national representatives; Tunku Abdul Rahman, chief minister of the Federation, Dato Tan Cheng-Lock, President of the MCA, and David Marshall, Chief Minister of the Colony of Singapore.

In his opening remarks, Tunku Abdul Rahman thanked the Communists for the confidence they had shown in coming to the meeting. He reminded them that his task was to explain the amnesty terms but not to stand in judgement over them. He then detailed the political changes which had been taking place in Malaya and explained that his election victory was based on the promise that "colonialism must end and that this country must be given freedom." He then mentioned the High Commissioner's announcement in the Legislative Council on 30 November that the British Government no longer considered "the Continuation of the Emergency" as "an obstacle to the Federation's advance to self-government". The British Government intended to enter the London talks in January "on that understanding". Since then the UMNO Assembly had passed a very important resolution to the effect that independence for Malaya must be given by 31 August 1957.

The Tunku then explained to Chin Peng that the objective of his Party was to bring peace to the country. But, in his opinion, there would be no way of bringing about peace other than to offer suitable amnesty terms for the surrender of the Communists. The Tunku reiterated that if the Communists accepted the amnesty "everyone would be pardoned." The Tunku then explained the amnesty terms in full. He added that the Government had carried out its part of the terms with regard to local ceasefires but that the Communists had continued offensive action. As a result, ceasefire arrangements had been suspended by the Government, although the Security Forces would like to know the reason. The Tunku also reminded Chin Peng that he did not come to the meeting as a spokesman for the British Government, he came "neither as the stooge or running dog of colonialism" but as a "servant of the people".

Chin Peng replied that it was because he realised that the Tunku was not "the spokesman of the British Government or the running dog of the British Government" that they were prepared to meet them at a risk to their lives.

Chin Peng explained that he had not come to the meeting to argue questions of ideology but to search for peace "so that the misery of the people can be reduced". Chin Peng pointed out the MCP rejected the amnesty offer because it did not permit Communists to "enjoy equal status so that those that genuinely intended to be loyal to the Government would be helped to regain their normal position in society." Chin Peng then mentioned the past statement by the Tunku that if the MCP stopped the armed struggle, then they could enjoy a status that would enable them to fight for independence by constitutional means. The amnesty terms did not contain such a point.

To this the Tunku replied that the amnesty specifically declared that Communists who gave up communism and showed that they genuinely intended to be loyal to the government would be "helped to regain their normal position in society". First, however, the communists would have to show their loyalty to Malaysia. In his view, simply to be anti-British was not sufficient to show that one was loyal to Malaya. The Tunku pointed out that the Malayan people regarded the Communist activities as something entirely foreign to the Malayan way of life. They regarded the Communist Party as belonging to a power outside the country and considered that its members gave allegiance to that foreign country and not Malaya.

During the second session, the discussion revolved around the question of loyalty to Malaya and recognition of the Malayan Communist Party. Chin Peng asked the Tunku to explain the actual meaning of "loyalty to Malaya." The Tunku stated that one of the things the Malayan people expected was that the Communist should give up their Communist activities. Loyalty to Malaya would include acceptance of the position of the Rulers and agreement to uphold their dignity. Dato Sir Tan Cheng-Lock added that if a man wanted to live in Malaya, he should assume the responsibilities and duties of a good citizen. David Marshall defined loyalty as "loyalty to the government of the day, and loyalty to the constitutional processes in bringing about such changes for the welfare of the people."

The talk then turned to the question of the recognition of the Malayan Communist Party. Chin Peng asked for recognition of the Malayan Communist Party. He asked the Tunku whether the giving up of Communist activities meant the dissolution of the Malayan Communist Party. The Tunku answered that it did. Chin Peng stressed the point that, as a member of the Malayan Communist Party, they were not prepared to be forced by others to give up that ideology, but wished to put their ideology to the people to decide, if that were possible. The Tunku replied that if the Malayan Communist Party was allowed to take part in free election, the people would choose the Alliance. The Tunku continued that the Communist and Malayan ideologies were not the same. The Malayan people preferred their own way of life, and the Communists must accept the way of life accepted by the majority. Chin Peng admitted that during the last few years, political progress had been made in Malaya and it was because of that he believed that the time had come when the Communist should come to the meeting with sincerity in the hope that they could solve their problems. However, he reiterated that he could not accept the amnesty conditions as they were then, because those conditions required them to dissolve the Malayan Communist Party. When asked by Chin Peng on what other means the emergency could be ended, the Tunku replied that Chin Peng and the members of the Malayan Communist Party must give up their communist activities and prove themselves loyal to the country.

Chin Peng stated that he did not see why since they were Communists they should "declare to the people that they were Communist. They did not wish to join other political parties and then do their scheming or intrigues. That is why they wanted the question of the recognition of the MCP to be settled."

Then Tunku said that he was not asking Communist to give up their ideology- "one's ideology is what one believes in" - but their activities were something quite different.

The Tunku reiterated that the Federal Government was not prepared to recognise the Malayan Communist Party because Communist activities had been associated with murder, with atrocities and with acts of violence of every kind. Furthermore, the MCP was composed of very few Malayan nationals. Chin Peng then asked whether the difference was because most of the members of the MCP in Malaya were Chinese. David Marshall replied that as far as Singapore was concerned that had nothing to do with it. The point was that the Communists were exercising violence. The Tunku added that in Malaya the situation was different because the Malays felt that the Communist owned their allegiance to Communist China.

Chin Peng put one more question before another adjournment. Was it necessary for any decisions made at the meeting to be approved by the British Government? The Tunku replied: "If I decide and Mr. Marshall agrees with me, that will be all."

The next session started at 6.30 p.m. and lasted until 8.05 p.m. Chin Peng returned with fresh vigour to the question of recognition of his party. One of several gambits turned on the question of whether his party would be accepted if its members were confined to federal citizens. "No", answered Tunku.

The talk turned to other aspects, such as the detention of surrendered terrorists for purposes of interrogation and investigation. The Tunku explained that investigation would be carried out very speedily. "We want to extract a promise from you that you will not carry on your activities, which we say are not loyal to Malaya and are prejudicial to the interests of Malaya and Malayans. We will want you to sign a declaration to that effect".

Chin Peng refused to accept this, declaring that for the "dignity of man" if this principle was insisted upon, then they would have to carry on with the struggle. This brought a question from Marshall, "Forgive me for asking, but what are you struggling for?" Chin Peng solemnly replied, "It is very simple, just for the dignity of man." Marshall exclaimed that using deed of violence to enforce their views on a population that does not want them was hardly compatible with the dignity of man. Chin Peng admitted that their outlook on this question was quite different and he was prepared to argue on it.

It was at this point that the talk really broke down. Chin Peng came back time and again to the points on which the Communists insisted: recognition of the MCP, no detention, no investigation and no restriction on their movements after surrender. The Tunku made it clear that after investigations and the removal of restriction on freedom, those Communists who remained in Malaya could join recognised political parties and to take part in politics, but they would not allowed to form a Communist Party under another name. At the end of the session, Marshall pleaded with them to try to consider the question soberly and to remember that there must be some sacrifice on their part. The Chief Ministers informed Chin Peng that they would be prepared to meet again on the following morning.

The delegations met again at 10.30 the next morning, but from the very beginning, Chin Peng continued his cardinal requests for political recognition of his party and freedom for its members. For Chin Peng, the purpose of investigation implied surrender and was unacceptable. He considered it as a humiliation: "If you demand our surrender we would prefer to fight to the last man". The Tunku replied that some surrender was inevitable. "... if you do not come out to surrender, we would rather not accept you in our society. If you want to have peace in this country, one side must give way. Either we give in to you or you give in to us." The Tunku stressed that he was not prepared to allow a situation where Malaya might be divided as had happened in the case of Korea and Vietnam. Malaya was too small and he had, therefore, to be frank with them and say that it was they who must surrender. The Chief Minister, before leaving, then appealed to Chin Peng to think of the general welfare of the people and informed him that if, in the near future, the Communists were prepared to show any change of attitude, they would not consider their pride in coming to meet him again. Within an hour, Chin Peng and his colleagues were returning to Klian Intan. The next day he joined his bodyguard and disappeared in the direction of South Thailand.

== Withdrawal of amnesty offer and aftermath ==
Following the talks, the Tunku decided to withdraw the amnesty offer on 8 February 1956, five months after it had been offered. He stated that he would be unwilling to meet the Communists again unless they indicated beforehand their desire to see him with an intention of surrender. He said that the Communists had made it clear to him that their ideology and that of himself and his party could not exist side by side. Therefore, the war must be intensified until one or the other gave in. "I have every confidence that the people of Malaya will give their fullest support and co-operation to the action I have taken."

Despite the failure of the Baling talk, the MCP made further efforts to resume peace talks with the Malayan Government but to no avail. A few weeks after the Baling talks, Tan Siew Sin received a letter from Chen Tien, requesting a resumption of peace talks and the repeal of the emergency regulations. The request was immediately rejected by the Chief Minister and instead, discussions began in the new Emergency Operations Council to intensify the "People's War" against the guerrillas. In July 1957, a few weeks before independence, the MCP made another request for peace talks. The MCP suggested the following conditions for a negotiated peace: its members would be given privileges enjoyed by ordinary citizens and there would be a guarantee that political as well as armed members of the MCP would not be punished. The Tunku, however, did not respond to the MCP's proposal.

On 31 August 1957 Malaya achieved her Independence with Tunku Abdul Rahman as the Prime Minister. Following that, there was a marked increase in the MCPs peace proposals and in November 1957, after a direct proposal from Chin Peng, Tunku Abdul Rahman agreed to a preliminary meeting. The border town of Kroh in northern Perak was chosen as a site for possible talks. However, Chin Peng did not accept the condition that is to surrender, and the talks failed to materialize.

The MCP's strength began to decline soon after. The Malayan Government increased its military activities to suppress the MCP and by 1960 they were forced to retire over the Malayan-Thai border because of their dwindling strength. On 31 July 1960, the Malayan Government declared the end of the twelve-year emergency. There continued to be minor incidents until 1989, but the communists were no longer a threat. They had lost their reason for insurrection as Malaya had achieved independence.
