= Chen Tien =

Malaysian politician (1923–1990)

- 陳田

Member of the Central Committee of the Malayan Communist Party
- In office October 1959 – 2 December 1989

Personal details
- Born: Koh Chye Kiet; 25 August 1923 36 North Canal Road, Singapore, Straits Settlements
- Died: 3 September 1990 (aged 67) Changsha, Hunan Province, People's Republic of China
- Party: Communist Party of Malaya
- Spouse: Lee Meng (m. 1965)
- Education: Raffles Institution

Chinese name
- Traditional Chinese: 陳田
- Simplified Chinese: 陈田
- Hanyu Pinyin: Chén Tián
- Jyutping: Can4 Tin4

Chen Tien or Chen Tian (simplified Chinese: 陈田; traditional Chinese: 陳田; pinyin: Chén Tián) (25 August 1923 – 3 September 1990) was the head of the Central Propaganda Department of the Communist Party of Malaya (CPM).

== Political career ==
Chen was present during the Baling Talks, along with the CPM's secretary-general Chin Peng and senior leader Rashid Maidin, to discuss the resolution of the Malayan Emergency. On the other side were three elected national representatives; Tunku Abdul Rahman, Tan Cheng Lock and David Marshall. The talks took place in the Government English School at Baling on 28 December 1956. However, the talks were unsuccessful because the surrender terms were not acceptable to the Malayan Communist Party and because of disagreement over the legalising of CPM as a political party in Malaya. A few weeks after the Baling talks, Tan Siew Sin, the president of the Malayan Chinese Association (MCA) received a letter from Chen Tien, requesting a resumption of peace talks and the repeal of the emergency regulations, which he rejected. In 1960, when the emergency was officially declared at an end, Chen Tien, Chin Peng and other communists continued their rebellion.

== Later life ==
After the talks, Chen Tien then left the party while Chin Peng remained. He moved to China and spent his later life in the country where he married Lee Meng in 1965, the female notorious leader of the CPM who had been banished a year before. Chen died due to lung cancer on 3 September 1990.
