= Lee Meng =

Malaysian Chinese communist guerrilla (1926–2012)

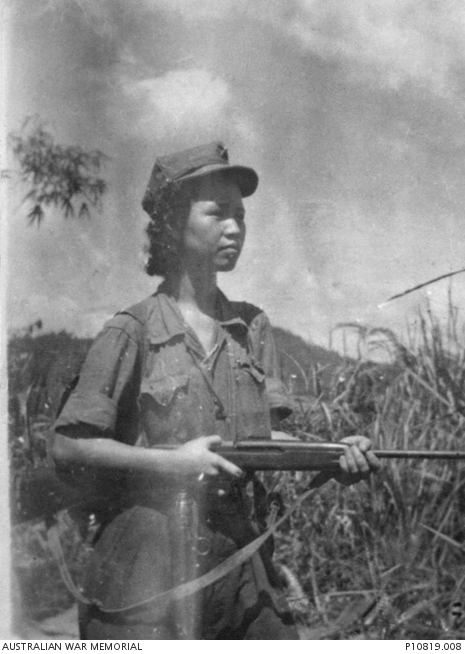
- Lee in 1951
- Born: Lee Ten Tai; 1926; Canton, Republic of China
- Died: 2 June 2012 (aged 85–86); Guangzhou, Guangdong, People's Republic of China
- Political party: Communist Party of Malaya
- Movement: Malayan Peoples' Anti-Japanese Army (1942–1945); Malayan National Liberation Army (1948–1952)
- Criminal charge: Illegal possession of a weapon
- Criminal penalty: Death, later reduced to imprisonment
- Criminal status: Commuted, released to China in 1964
- Spouse: Chen Tien (m. 1965; died 1990)

Chinese name
- Chinese: 李明
Transcriptions
Standard Mandarin
- Hanyu Pinyin: Lǐ Míng
Yue: Cantonese
- Jyutping: Lei^{5} Ming^{4}
Southern Min
- Hokkien POJ: Lí Bêng
- Tâi-lô: Lí Bîng

Birth name
- Chinese: 李天泰
Transcriptions
Standard Mandarin
- Hanyu Pinyin: Lǐ Tiāntài
Yue: Cantonese
- Jyutping: Lei^{5} Tin^{1}-taai^{3}

Lee Meng (Chinese: 李明; 1926–2012), also romanised as Lee Min, was a Malaysian Chinese communist, guerrilla fighter, and leading member of the Communist Party of Malaya (CPM). She took part in guerrilla resistance against the Japanese occupation of Malaya as a member of the Malayan Peoples' Anti-Japanese Army (MPAJA) and later joined the Malayan National Liberation Army (MNLA) during the Malayan Emergency to fight against British rule in Malaya. She was described as one of the most capable members of the local communist movement, and was also the leader of the "Kepayang Gang" in Perak.

== Background and early life ==
Born Lee Ten Tai (李天泰) in Canton, China in 1926, Lee moved to Ipoh together with her family at the age of five. She worked first as a school teacher in a Chinese school located in Anson Bay (present-day Teluk Intan) in Perak during the British Military Administration shortly after the Japanese surrender on 12 September 1945. Lee had joined the Communist Party of Malaya (CPM) at the age of 16 when she was recruited by a school teacher in 1942. Her father was unemployed and lived with her uncle and aunt while her mother was later banished back to Mainland China by the British colonial authorities in 1950 after being arrested for involvement in communist activities.

== Underground activities ==
Prior to her recruitment, she led the party's underground area committee of Ipoh during the Japanese occupation of British Malaya where she had a reputation as a cunning fighter and plot organiser and was known as one of the most ruthless members of the CPM in Ipoh. She also operated Central Committee communication posts which co-ordinated top secret communist communication networks with links to other states such as Pahang, Selangor, Penang and as far to Singapore. A majority of her followers were female, both young and old with legal cover occupations and throughout these activities, she helped any pregnant wives of high ranking communists in Perak by sheltering them in the houses of selected relatives.

Throughout the Malayan Emergency, she controlled many of the major armed units in the town area, including the notorious Kepayang Gang along with Special Mobile Squad (SMS) that were reported as being responsible for many of the assassinations and grenade attacks that were carried out between 1948 until 1951. Although the Special Branch was unable to prove Lee's involvement in any of the attacks, she held the utmost responsibility as most of the units were under her control. Many captured or surrendered communist guerrillas named her as the one who ordered a number of executions against collaborators, which were carried out by Communist Special Service squads. She was described by the communist party's leader Chin Peng as a dedicated, active and brave woman, though reckless in her operational style.

== Events leading to her capture ==
Irene Lee, whose husband, Detective Corporal Jimmy Loke, was assassinated by communist guerrillas in Penang in April 1951, decided to join the Malayan police force where she was promoted to Detective-Inspector, and was subsequently posted to Special Branch headquarters in Kuala Lumpur. Irene Lee's work as a detective led to the British colonial government acquiring information concerning the working of the Chinese communist party, which led eventually to Lee Meng's capture by the colonial forces.

=== Manhunt and subsequent arrest ===
Following a raid on a communist guerrilla camp in Selangor in early February 1952, documents from the abandoned camp revealed the identity of a Chinese woman serving as a courier member from Singapore into Johor which identified as Ah Shu or Ah Soo, a Chinese school teacher and the wife of Wong Fook Kwang (Tit Fung), the leader of the Communist-controlled Workers Protection Corps in Singapore. The woman's husband was responsible for the killings of pineapple and rubber merchant Lim Teck Kin and several others including a policeman, a factory supervisor and a manager at Hock Lee Bus Company in Singapore. Once the identity of Ah Shu was identified, Irene was sent by her department into Singapore in February 1952 to track the woman and follow a trail that would ultimately lead to Lee's arrest and her eventual banishment to mainland China.

Lee was captured by the British Malayan police force in Ipoh in July 1952, tried for having a hand grenade in her possession and sentenced to death for her responsibility in issuing orders for several murders. In February 1953, a petition was signed by 60 members of the Parliament of the United Kingdom to the Sultan of Perak to grant a pardon to Lee since her early petition to appeal the Privy Council had been dismissed by the Judicial Committee. Within the same year, the Hungarian People's Republic government offered to swap British national Edgar Sanders, who had been charged in Budapest for suspected espionage, for her. The British Prime Minister at the time, Winston Churchill initially refused but following the order by the Sultan of Perak who agreed to pardon and persuaded the British authorities, along with the efforts of Lim Phaik Gan, a British-born Malayan woman lawyer and diplomat, her sentence was commuted and she was released to the People's Republic of China in 1964, after serving her term for 11 years in Taiping prison.

== Later life and death ==
Following her banishment to China, Lee was reunited with her mother, with whom she stayed until her mother's death. In 1965, she married Chen Tien, a fellow exiled Malayan communist insurgent and one of Chin Peng's most trusted aides. Both had intended to move to southern Thailand, but on 3 September 1990, Tien died of lung cancer, which made her indecisive whether she should move or stay. In August 2007, Lee visited Malaysia to meet one of her trial lawyers, Lim, to thank her for securing a commutation of her conviction. Lee died in exile in Guangzhou, China, on 2 June 2012 at the age of 86.
