= Flag of Malaysia =

Malaysia
- Jalur Gemilang ('Stripes of Glory')
- Use: National flag
- Proportion: 1:2
- Adopted: 26 May 1950; 76 years ago (original 11-point star and 11 stripes); 16 September 1963; 63 years ago (current 14-point star and 14 stripes)
- Design: Fourteen horizontal stripes alternating red and white; in the canton, a yellow crescent and fourteen-point star on a blue field
- Designed by: Mohamed Hamzah (Note: Hamzah designed the flag of Malaya. The current flag is an adaptation of Hamzah's original design.)
- Use: Hung vertically as a banner
- Adopted: 16 September 1963
- Design: Fourteen vertical stripes alternating red and white; in the canton, a yellow crescent and 14-point star pointing upward on a blue field

The national flag of Malaysia, also known as the Stripes of Glory (Jalur Gemilang, also "Stripes of Excellence"), is composed of a field of 14 alternating red and white stripes along the fly, and a blue canton bearing a crescent and a 14-point star known as the Bintang Persekutuan (Federal Star).

The 14 stripes, of equal width, represent the equal status in the federation of the 13 member states and the federal territories, while the 14 points of the star represent the unity among these entities. The crescent represents Islam, the country's state religion; the blue canton symbolises the unity of the Malaysian people; the yellow of the star and crescent is the royal colour of the Malay rulers; the red stripes represent bravery; and the white stripes represent purity. The red, white and blue also symbolises Malaysia's inclusion within the Commonwealth. The flag is in the stars and stripes family of flags.

== Construction sheet ==
Flag construction sheet

== History ==
Flag ratio: 1:2. Flag of Malaysia in use from 1950 to 1963.

=== Selection ===
In 1949, a year after the Federation of Malaya was created, the Federal Legislative Council called for a contest to design a new national flag. The competition attracted 373 entries, three of which were put forward to the public in a poll held by The Malay Mail.

The first flag had a ring of 11 white stars on a blue background, with two red Malay kris (daggers) in the middle. The second was the same as the first but with two concentric rings of 5 and 6 stars. The third had 11 blue and white stripes, and a red field in the top-left corner with a white crescent and five-pointed star on it. This last design was chosen as the winner.

First proposed flag

Second proposed flag

Third proposed flag

In December 1949, the Federal Legislative Council decided to make changes to the winning design. At the suggestion of statesman Onn Jaafar, the red and blue colours were swapped, the crescent and star were changed from white to yellow, and the star was given eleven points. The final version of the Malayan flag was approved by King George VI on 19 May 1950 and was first raised in front of the Sultan of Selangor's residence on 26 May 1950. On 31 August 1957, it was raised upon independence at Merdeka Square in place of the Union Flag.

=== Symbolism ===
As the flag was finalised for official use, the significance of the design were given as follows:

- Red, white and blue – represents Malaysia as a country belonging in the Commonwealth and its links with Britain.
- Crescent and star – represents Islam as the official religion for the Federation, as yellow symbolises sovereignty of the Malay Rulers and their roles as leader of the faith in the constituent states. The eleven-pointed star itself symbolises the "unity and co-operation" of said member states.

=== The designer ===
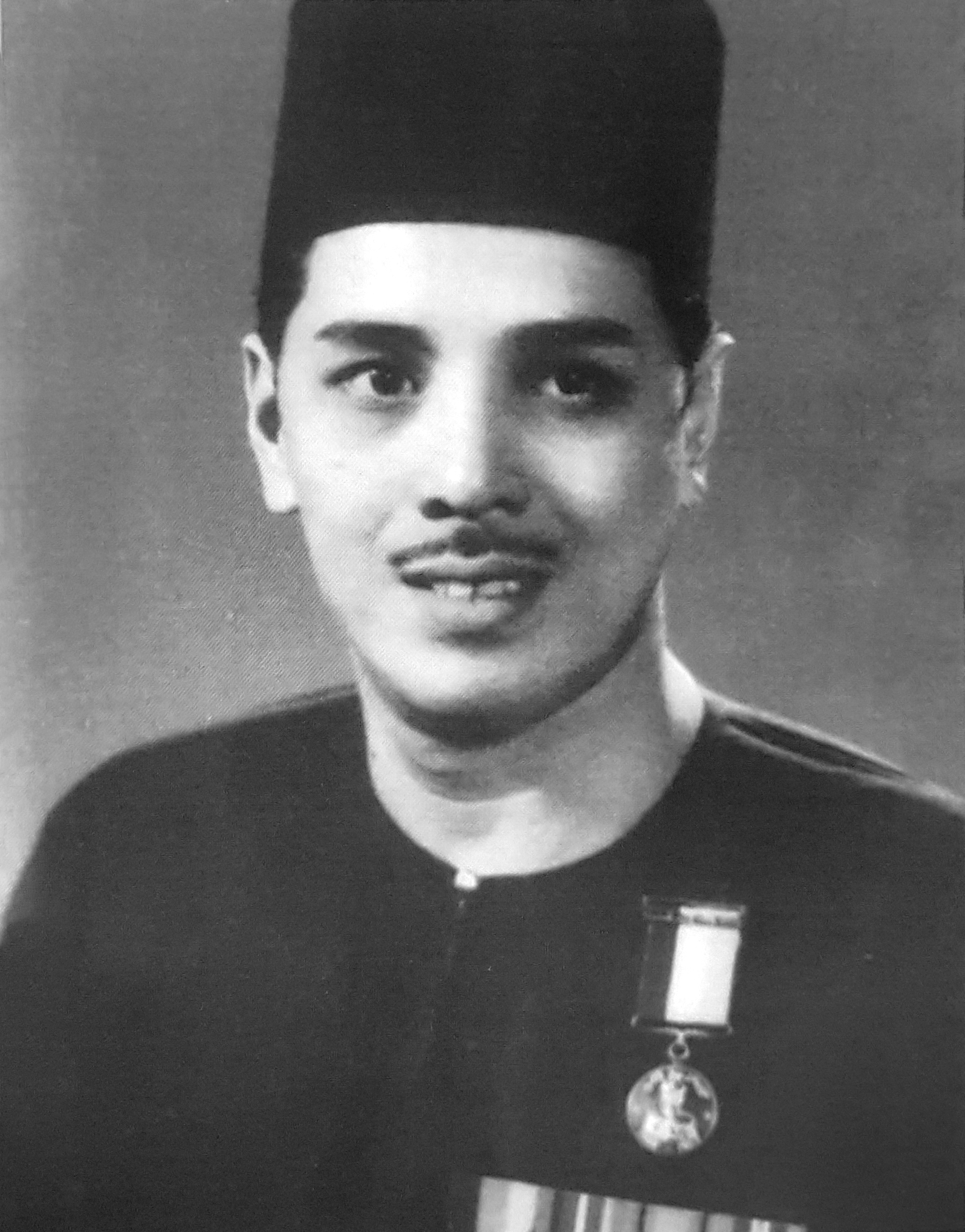
Mohamed upon receiving the Sultan Ibrahim Diamond Jubilee Medal in 1955.

Flag of Johor

The Malayan flag was designed by Mohamed Hamzah, a 29-year-old architect working for the Public Works Department (JKR) in Johor Bahru, in the state of Johor. He entered the national flag design competition with four designs that he had completed in three days. The flag that became one of the three finalists was said to be inspired by the flag of Johor, but with five white stripes added to the blue field.

=== Modifications ===
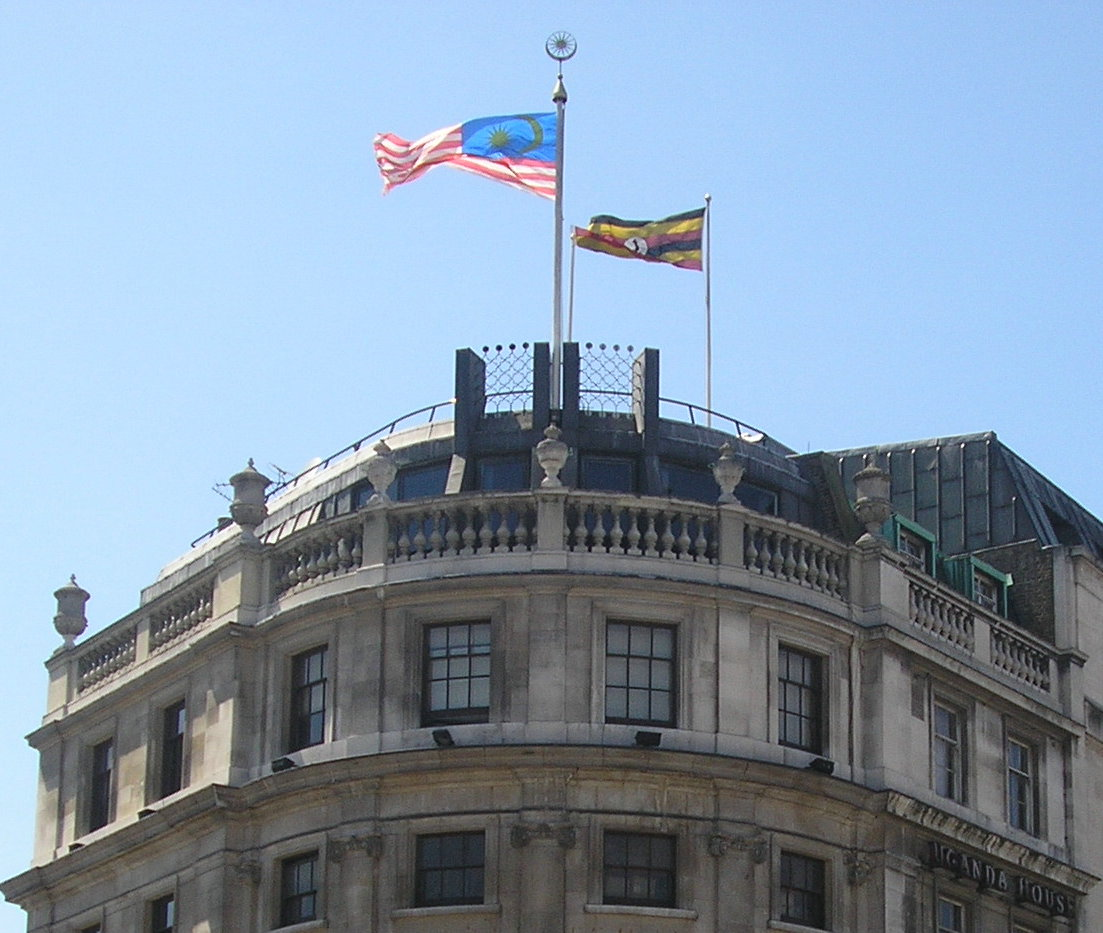
The Malaysian flag flying above the Tourism Malaysia office in Trafalgar Square, London. The flag of Uganda is seen by its side over Uganda House.

Following the formation of Malaysia on 16 September 1963, the design of the Malayan flag was modified to reflect and honour the new states in the federation.

Three additional stripes were added to the existing flag to make it 14 and the star was given 14 points to reflect the federation of the 11 states in the Malay peninsula plus Sabah, Sarawak, and Singapore; the design remained the same even after Singapore's expulsion from the federation two years later. When Kuala Lumpur was designated a Federal Territory on 1 February 1974, the additional stripe and the point in the star were appropriated to represent this new addition to the federation. Eventually, with the addition of two other federal territories, Labuan in 1984 and Putrajaya in 2001, the fourteenth stripe and point in the star came to be associated with the federal territories in general.

In 1997, when Malaysians were invited to name the flag, then Prime Minister Mahathir Mohamad picked the name Jalur Gemilang to project the country's onward drive toward continuous growth and success.

== Mark of respect ==
During the National Day celebrations, everyone is encouraged to fly the Jalur Gemilang at their homes, office buildings, shops and corporate premises.

- If the flag is fixed at home, it is to be raised pointing toward the road.
- If the flag is put in a group of flags with state and private company flags, the Malaysian flag must be raised in between two flags and its pole placed higher than the rest.

=== Inappropriate use ===
The use of Malaysian flag is subject to the Emblems and Names (Prevention of Improper Use) Act 1963. Under the Act, the Malaysian flag may not be used for commercial, trade or business purposes without the written permission of a minister. The flag also cannot be used in the registration of patents, trademarks or design. Violators may be punished with up to RM20,000 fine or up to 3 years imprisonment, or both.

== Historical flags ==
Flag of the Kingdom of Sarawak from 1870 to 1946.

Flag of the Crown Colony of Sarawak from 1947 to 1963.

Flag of North Borneo from 1882 to 1902.

Flag of North Borneo from 1902 to 1946.

Flag of the Crown Colony of North Borneo from 1948 to 1963.

Flag of the Crown Colony of Labuan from 1912 to 1946.

Flag of the Straits Settlements from 1826 to 1868

Flag of the Straits Settlements from 1868 to 1877

Flag of the Straits Settlements from 1874 (Note: Officially adopted in 1874, but only fully used in 1877) to 1904.

Flag of the Straits Settlements from 1904 to 1925.

Flag of the Straits Settlements from 1925 to 1946.

Flag of Crown Colony of Penang from 1949 to 1952

Flag of Crown Colony of Penang from 1952 to 1957

Flag of Crown Colony of Malacca from 1946 to 1957.

Flag of the Crown Colony of Singapore from 1946 to 1952.

Flag of the Crown Colony of Singapore from 1952 to 1959.

Flag of the Federated Malay States from 1896 to 1946; later adopted by the Malayan Union from 1946 until 1948 and the Federation of Malaya from 1948 to 1950.

Flag of the Federation of Malaya from 1950 to 1963.

Flag of Malaysia in current use since 1963.

== Flag anthem ==
The flag anthem is written as dedication and pride of the Malaysian national flag. It is performed on the nation's independence day, also known as Hari Merdeka or Hari Kemerdekaan in Malay on 31 August every year. The original anthem Benderaku was written by Malaysian songwriter Tony Fonseka. After the flag was given the name Jalur Gemilang, the flag anthem was updated in 1997 to reflect this change. This was then followed by an introduction of a new flag anthem, with arrangements by Malaysian songwriter Pak Ngah and lyrics by Malaysian songwriter Siso Kopratasa.

Benderaku by Tony Fonseka Benderaku yang gagah perkasa Merah putih kuning biru warnanya Berkibar megah penuh bercahaya Pusaka kita rakyat Malaysia Bendera Malaysia, oh benderaku Kupertahankan sepenuh ragaku Dikaulah lambang negara berpadu Di bawah naungan Duli Tuanku Berkibar terus oh benderaku Kaukan kujunjung sepanjang waktu Harumlah nama negara yang tercinta Padamu tempat taat dan setia Bendera Malaysia, bendera kita Kemegahan rakyat kita semua Berkibar berkibar di ruang angkasa Dirgahayu bendera tercinta!	English translation The mighty flag of mine Red, White, Yellow and Blue are the colours Flying high up in the skies The legacy of all of us Malaysians O my flag, The Flag of Malaysia I will defend it with all of my might The Symbol of a unified nation Under the patronage of His Royal Highness Fly high o my flag I will raise it all the time O shine up, my beloved nation To you, I swear my full allegiance The Flag of Malaysia, our flag The pride of all of us Fly, fly high up in the skies Long live our beloved flag!
Jalur Gemilang by Pak Ngah & Siso Kopratasa (Malay) Merahmu bara semangat waja Putihmu bersih budi pekerti Kuning berdaulat payung negara Biru perpaduan kami semua Puncak dunia telah kautawan Lautan luas telah kauredah Membawa semangat jiwa Merdeka Semarak jaya kami warganya Empat belas melintang jalurnya Semua negeri dalam Malaysia Satu suara satu semangat Itu sumpah warga berdaulat Jalur Gemilang di bawah naunganmu Jalur Gemilang kami semua bersatu Perpaduan ketaatan Amalan murni rakyat Malaysia Jalur Gemilang megah kami terasa Jalur Gemilang kibarkanlah wawasan Merah, putih, biru, kuning Jalur semangat kami semua (2x) Berkibarlah!, berkibarlah!, berkibarlah!, Jalur Gemilang!	English Translation Your Red represents steely will Your White represents clean and kind character Yellow of the Sovereign, the country's protector Blue for all of us in unity You have reached the heights of the world You have travelled the wide waters Bearing the spirit of independence We are members of its successful will Fourteen stripes across For each of the states of Malaysia One voice, one spirit So its sovereign citizens solemnly swear Stripes of Glory, beneath your care Stripes of Glory, we unite Unity and loyalty Are the noble values of the Malaysian people Stripes of Glory, how proud we feel Stripes of Glory, proclaim our vision Red, white, blue, yellow Are the stripes of our resolve (2x) Flutter-on, flutter-on, flutter-on Stripes of Glory!

Jalur gemilang (vocal)

== Other ensigns and flags ==
Government vessels use the Jalur Gemilang as the state ensign. The following is a table of the other ensigns used in Malaysia with the national flag inside.

Flag	Type	Description	Flag ratio
Civil ensign.	Civil ensign	The civil ensign of Malaysia used by civilian vessels has a red background with the Jalur Gemilang in a blue-fimbriated canton.	1:2
Government ensign	Malaysian Government blue ensign	The flag used by the Malaysian Government has a dark blue background with the Jalur Gemilang in the canton.	1:2
MMEA blue ensign.	Malaysian Maritime Enforcement Agency blue ensign	The flag used by the Malaysian Maritime Enforcement Agency has a dark blue background with the Jalur Gemilang in the canton and the logo of the agency in the fly.	1:2
Army ensign.	Army ensign	The flag used by the Malaysian Army has a red background with the Jalur Gemilang in the canton and the army emblem in the fly.	1:2
Air Force ensign.	Air Force ensign	The flag used by the Royal Malaysian Air Force has a pale blue background with the Jalur Gemilang in the canton and the Bintang Persekutuan (14-point star) in the fly.	1:2
Naval ensign.	Naval ensign	The flag used by the Royal Malaysian Navy has a white background with the Jalur Gemilang in a red-fimbriated canton and an emblem consisting of an anchor and two crossed traditional kris (daggers) in the fly. Naval ships of the Royal Malaysian Navy use this flag as the naval ensign.	1:2

== Federal Star (Bintang Persekutuan) ==
The Federal Star is similar in concept of Australia's Commonwealth Star in that it symbolises the unity of states in the Malaysian federation and its Federal government, featuring 14 points to represent the federation's 13 states and the federal territories. It is also used on the Royal Malaysian Air Force roundel, the Malaysian Chinese Association (MCA) flag and the former United Malayan Banking Corporation (UMBC) logo.

The Patani Malayu National Revolutionary Front, a Southern Thai Malay separatist group involved in the South Thailand insurgency, originally adopted an independence flag that incorporated a crescent and 15-point variation of the Federal Star on its flag to represent the southernmost Thai provinces' closer tie to Malay and Muslim-majority Malaysia over that of Thailand.

Royal Malaysian Air Force roundel

Malaysian Chinese Association (MCA) flag

Deprecated Patani Malayu National Revolutionary Front flag, with a crescent and 15-point Federal Star

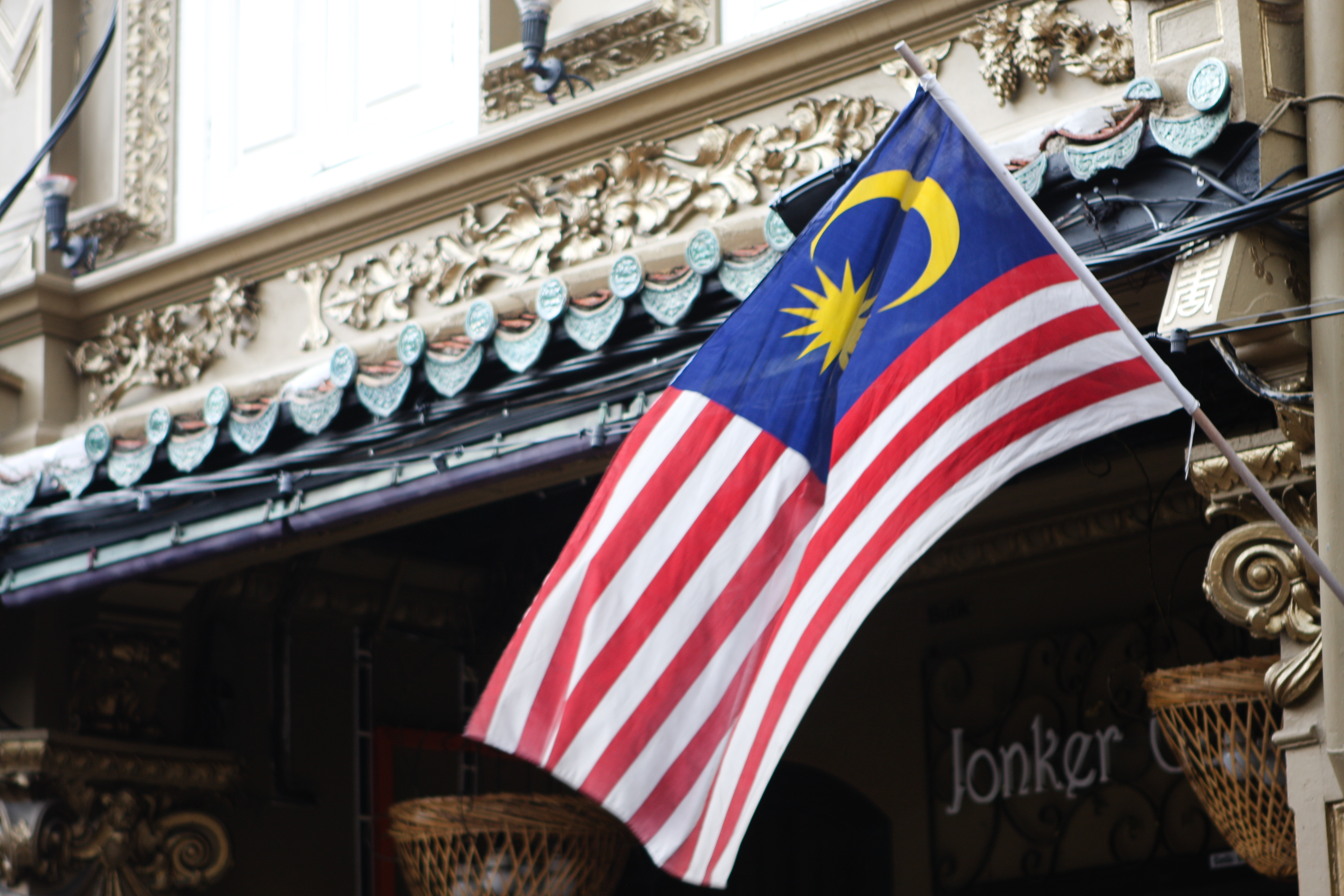
Malaysian flag flying on a pole

== See also ==
- List of Malaysian flags
- List of Malaysian patriotic songs
- Sang Saka Malaya, an earlier flag proposal
