= Abdul Hamid Omar =

Malaysian judge (1929–2009)

Yang Amat Berbahagia Tun Dato' Seri Abdul Hamid Omar SSM SPMS SSMT PMN PSM SIMP DPMP SPMT

1st Chief Justice of Malaysia
- In office 10 November 1988 – 24 September 1994
- Preceded by: Post created Salleh Abas as Lord President of the Supreme Court
- Succeeded by: Eusoff Chin

Personal details
- Born: Abdul Hamid bin Omar; 25 March 1929 Kuala Perlis, Perlis, Unfederated Malay States, British Malaya
- Died: 1 September 2009 (aged 80) Kuala Lumpur, Malaysia
- Spouse: Azian Aiyub Ghazali
- Education: Lincoln's Inn

Abdul Hamid bin Omar (25 March 1929 – 1 September 2009) was the first Chief Justice of Malaysia.

== Early life ==
Abdul Hamid Omar was born on 25 March 1929 in Kuala Perlis, Perlis Indera Kayangan. He obtained his early education at the Sultan Abdul Hamid College in Alor Setar in 1940, which could not be completed as a result of the Second World War. During the war, he was able to master the Japanese language. When the war ended, he returned to Alor Setar to continue his studies and passed his Senior Cambridge examination. Later, he left for London to further his studies at Lincoln's Inn, and graduated as a Barrister-at-Law in England. He was called to the English Bar in November 1955.

== Career ==
He first entered the Malaysian Civil Service as a Magistrate in 1956, and then moved to become Deputy Public Prosecutor of Perak State (1960–1961) and then quickly moved to being State Legal Advisor of Perak (1961–1962). After a few years, he was made Chief Registrar of the Federal Court (1967) and soon afterwards a High Court Judge (1968). After becoming Chief Justice of Malaya in 1985, he was involved in the 1988 Malaysian constitutional crisis, chairing the six-member tribunal which resulted in the dismissal of the then Lord President Tun Salleh Abas. After taking over as Lord President of the Supreme Court a vote of no confidence was passed against him by the Bar Council. He retired shortly after he became Chief Justice of Malaysia in 1994, when the Lord President post was abolished and renamed. He was also involved with the Malaysian Red Crescent Society and joined the private sector after his retirement from the judiciary where he was chairman of several companies.

His career is mired in controversy as he was widely believed to be the architect and conduit of the 1988 Malaysian constitutional crisis. He was also one of the 20 judges who had agreed to Tun Salleh writing a letter to the YDPA (the King) expressing concerns over the Prime Minister's attacks on the independence of the Malaysian judiciary.

== Death ==
In early 2008 he suffered from a debilitating stroke. He died aged 80 on 1 September 2009 from renal failure at the Gleneagles Hospital, Kuala Lumpur.

== Honours ==
- Malaysia
  - Grand Commander of the Order of Loyalty to the Crown of Malaysia (SSM) – Tun (1989)
  - Commander of the Order of the Defender of the Realm (PMN) – Tan Sri (1986)
  - Commander of the Order of Loyalty to the Crown of Malaysia (PSM) – Tan Sri (1981)
- Pahang
  - Grand Knight of the Order of the Crown of Pahang (SIMP) – formerly Dato', now Dato' Indera (1985)
- Perak
  - Knight Grand Commander of the Order of the Perak State Crown (DPMP) – Dato' (1967)
  - Commander of the Order of the Perak State Crown (PMP) (1966)
- Selangor
  - Knight Grand Commander of Order of the Crown of Selangor (SPMS) – Dato' Seri (1991)
- Terengganu
  - Knight Grand Companion of the Order of Sultan Mahmud I of Terengganu (SSMT) – Dato' Seri (1991)
  - Knight Grand Commander of the Order of the Crown of Terengganu (SPMT) – Dato' Seri

Political offices
Preceded by Salleh Abas	Lord President of the Supreme Court; 1989–1994	Post abolished
Preceded by Lord President of the Supreme Court; Post created	Chief Justice of Malaysia; 1994	Succeeded by Eusoff Chin
