= 2000 in Malaysia =

- Decades: 1980s; 1990s; 2000s; 2010s; 2020s
- See also: Other events of 2000; History of Malaysia • Timeline • Years

This article lists important figures and events in Malaysian public affairs during the year 2000, together with births and deaths of notable Malaysians. 2000 marked is 43rd anniversary of Malaysia's Independence.

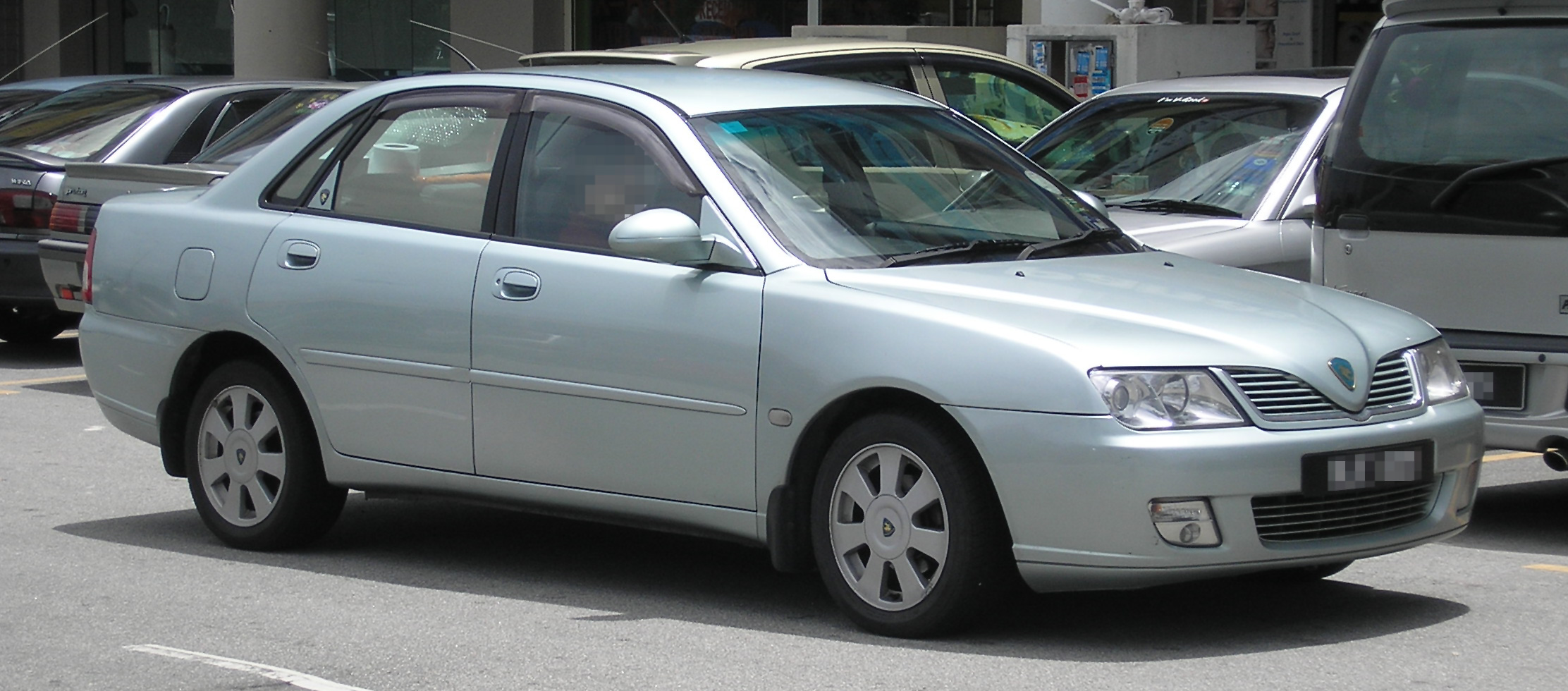
Proton Waja

== Incumbent political figures ==
=== Federal level ===
- Yang di-Pertuan Agong: Sultan Salahuddin Abdul Aziz Shah of Selangor
- Raja Permaisuri Agong: Tengku Permaisuri Siti Aishah of Selangor
- Deputy Yang di-Pertuan Agong: Sultan Mizan Zainal Abidin of Terengganu
- Prime Minister: Tun Dr. Mahathir Mohamad
- Deputy Prime Minister: Dato' Sri Abdullah Ahmad Badawi
- President of the Dewan Negara:
  - Tan Sri Dato' Haji Mohamed Yaacob (until 5 December)
  - Tun Tan Sri Michael Chen Wing Sum (from 7 December)
- Speaker of the Dewan Rakyat: Tun Dr. Mohamed Zahir Ismail
- Chief Justice:
  - Mohd Eusoff Chin (until 19 December)
  - Mohamed Dzaiddin Abdullah (from 20 December)

=== State level ===
- Johor:
  - Sultan of Johor: Sultan Iskandar
  - Menteri Besar of Johor: Abdul Ghani Othman
- Kedah:
  - Sultan of Kedah: Sultan Abdul Halim Mu'adzam Shah
  - Menteri Besar of Kedah: Syed Razak Syed Zain Barakbah
- Kelantan:
  - Sultan of Kelantan: Sultan Ismail Petra
  - Menteri Besar of Kelantan: Nik Abdul Aziz Nik Mat
- Perlis:
  - Raja of Perlis:
    - Tuanku Syed Putra (until 16 April)
    - Tuanku Syed Sirajuddin (from 17 April)
  - Menteri Besar of Perlis: Shahidan Kassim
- Perak:
  - Sultan of Perak: Sultan Azlan Muhibbuddin Shah
  - Menteri Besar of Perak: Tajol Rosli Mohd Ghazali
- Pahang:
  - Sultan of Pahang: Sultan Haji Ahmad Shah Al-Musta'in Billah
  - Menteri Besar of Pahang: Adnan Yaakob
- Selangor:
  - Sultan of Selangor: Tengku Idris Shah (Regent)
  - Menteri Besar of Selangor:
    - Abu Hassan Omar (until 9 August)
    - Mohamad Khir Toyo (from 18 August)
- Terengganu:
  - Sultan of Terengganu: Sultan Mizan Zainal Abidin
  - Menteri Besar of Terengganu: Abdul Hadi Awang
- Negeri Sembilan:
  - Yang di-Pertuan Besar of Negeri Sembilan: Tuanku Ja'afar
  - Menteri Besar of Negeri Sembilan: Mohd Isa Abdul Samad
- Penang:
  - Governor of Penang: Tun Hamdan Sheikh Tahir
  - Chief Minister of Penang: Koh Tsu Koon
- Malacca:
  - Governor of Malacca: Tun Syed Ahmad Syed Mahmud Shahabuddin
  - Chief Minister of Malacca: Mohd Ali Rustam
- Sarawak:
  - Governor of Sarawak: Tun Ahmad Zaidi Adruce Mohammed Noor (until 5 December)
  - Chief Minister of Sarawak: Abdul Taib Mahmud
- Sabah:
  - Governor of Sabah: Tun Sakaran Dandai
  - Chief Minister of Sabah: Osu Sukam

== Events ==
- 1 January
  - Visit Selangor Year 2000 officially began.
  - Y2K passed without serious, widespread computer failures, as many experts and businesses had feared.
- January – The Kuala Lumpur Stock Exchange (KLSE) Composite Index rose to 1,000 points.
- 25 January – 6 February — 2000 Tour de Langkawi.
- 20 February – Kota Kinabalu was granted city status.
- 31 March–2 April – 2000 Malaysian motorcycle Grand Prix.
- 16 April – Raja of Perlis, Tuanku Syed Putra, died in the National Heart Institute (Malaysia), Kuala Lumpur, aged 79. On 17 April, his son Tengku Syed Sirajuddin was elected as the 8th Raja of Perlis.
- 23 April – 21 people were kidnapped by the Philippine terrorist group Abu Sayyaf at Sipadan Island, Sabah.
- May – Mahsuri's seventh generation, Wan Aishah Wan Nawawi visited Kedah and Langkawi Island.
- 1 May
  - Zeti Akhtar Aziz was appointed the seventh governor of Bank Negara Malaysia. She was the first woman to lead the central bank.
  - The Malaysian Palm Oil Board (MPOB), a body overseeing the palm oil industry in Malaysia, was formed as a merger between the Palm Oil Research Institute of Malaysia (PORIM) and the Palm Oil Registration and Licensing Authority (PORLA).
- 25 May – 4 June – The 2000 Sukma Games was held in Penang, with newly built Penang State Stadium in Batu Kawan as the main venue.
- June – The Telok Kemang MP by-election took place, Barisan Nasional (BN) candidate S. Sothinathan winning this by-election.
- 25 June – 2000 International Penang Bridge Run.
- 1 July – The Sauk arms heist in Sauk, Perak. Many of Al-Mau'nah's gang members were arrested.
- 1 August – The Proton Waja, the very first Malaysian-designed car, was launched.
- 10–14 August — Malaysia at the 2000 Commonwealth Youth Games in Edinburgh, Scotland.
- 15 September – 1 October — Malaysia at the 2000 Summer Olympics in Sydney, Australia.
- 26 September – The first Malaysian micro satellite Tiung SAT was launched from Baikonur Cosmodrome, Kazakhstan.
- 10 October – Shah Alam was granted city status.
- 18–29 October — Malaysia at the 2000 Summer Paralympics in Sydney, Australia.
- 31 October – Four Malaysians on Singapore Airlines Flight 006 died when the flight attempted to take off from the wrong runway at Chiang Kai-shek International Airport, Taoyuan, Taiwan during a typhoon, resulting in the aircraft crashing into construction equipment on the runway, killing 83 of the 179 occupants aboard.
- 4 November – Lunas, Kedah state assemblyman, Dr Joe Fernandez was assassinated in Bukit Mertajam, Penang.
- 29 November – 2000 Lunas by-election took place, Parti Keadilan Nasional candidate, Saifuddin Nasution Ismail winning this by-election.
- 5 December – Governor of Sarawak, Tun Ahmad Zaidi Adruce Muhammed Noor died at the age of 76. On 22 December, he was replaced by Tun Abang Muhammad Salahuddin as a new Governor of Sarawak.
- 22 December – The 2000 Federal Territory of Putrajaya Agreement was signed at Istana Negara between Yang di-Pertuan Agong Sultan Salahuddin Abdul Aziz Shah of Selangor and Tengku Idris Shah (Regent of Selangor).

== National Day ==
=== Theme ===
Keranamu Malaysia (Because of you, Malaysia)

=== National Day parade ===
Independence Square, Shah Alam, Selangor

== Births ==
- 27 January – Aznie Azmi, rapper.
- 30 January – Goh Jin Wei, badminton player.
- 17 February – Amir Ahnaf, actor, singer.
- 14 March – Pearly Tan, badminton player.
- 1 April – Danial Asri, footballer.
- 13 April – Ismail Izzani, singer.
- 17 April – Tee Kai Wun, badminton player.
- 16 May – Ng Tze Yong, badminton player.
- 25 August – Jason Teh, Singaporean badminton player.
- 6 October – Nureizkhan Isa, footballer.
- 2 November – Eoon Qi Xuan, badminton player.
- c. November – Sabrina Bahsoon, social media influencer.

== Deaths ==
- 12 March – Tun Sharifah Rodziah Syed Alwi Barakbah, spouse of the first Malaysian Prime Minister, Tunku Abdul Rahman Putra Al-Haj and former First Lady of Malaysia (b. 1920).
- 21 March – Zainon Chan, Member of the Politburo of the Malayan Communist Party (b. 1923).
- 16 April – Tuanku Syed Putra of Perlis, 7th Raja of Perlis and 3rd Yang di-Pertuan Agong of Malaysia (b. 1920).
- 18 April – Ismail Khan, 6th President of the Dewan Negara (b. 1905).
- 19 April – Ong Kee Hui, politician and founder of the Sarawak United People's Party (b. 1914).
- 27 April – Yusof Rawa, 5th President of the Malaysian Islamic Party (b. 1922).
- 8 August – Normadiah, actress (b. 1932).
- 26 September – Tun Mohd Suffian Hashim, 4th Lord President of the Supreme Court of Malaysia (b. 1917).
- 5 December – Tun Ahmad Zaidi Adruce Mohammed Noor, 5th Yang di-Pertua Negeri of Sarawak (b. 1924).

== See also ==
- 2000
- 1999 in Malaysia | 2001 in Malaysia
- History of Malaysia
- List of Malaysian films of 2000
