= 1994 in Malaysia =

- Decades: 1970s; 1980s; 1990s; 2000s; 2010s
- See also: Other events of 1994; History of Malaysia • Timeline • Years

This article lists important figures and events in Malaysian public affairs during the year 1994, together with births and deaths of notable Malaysians.

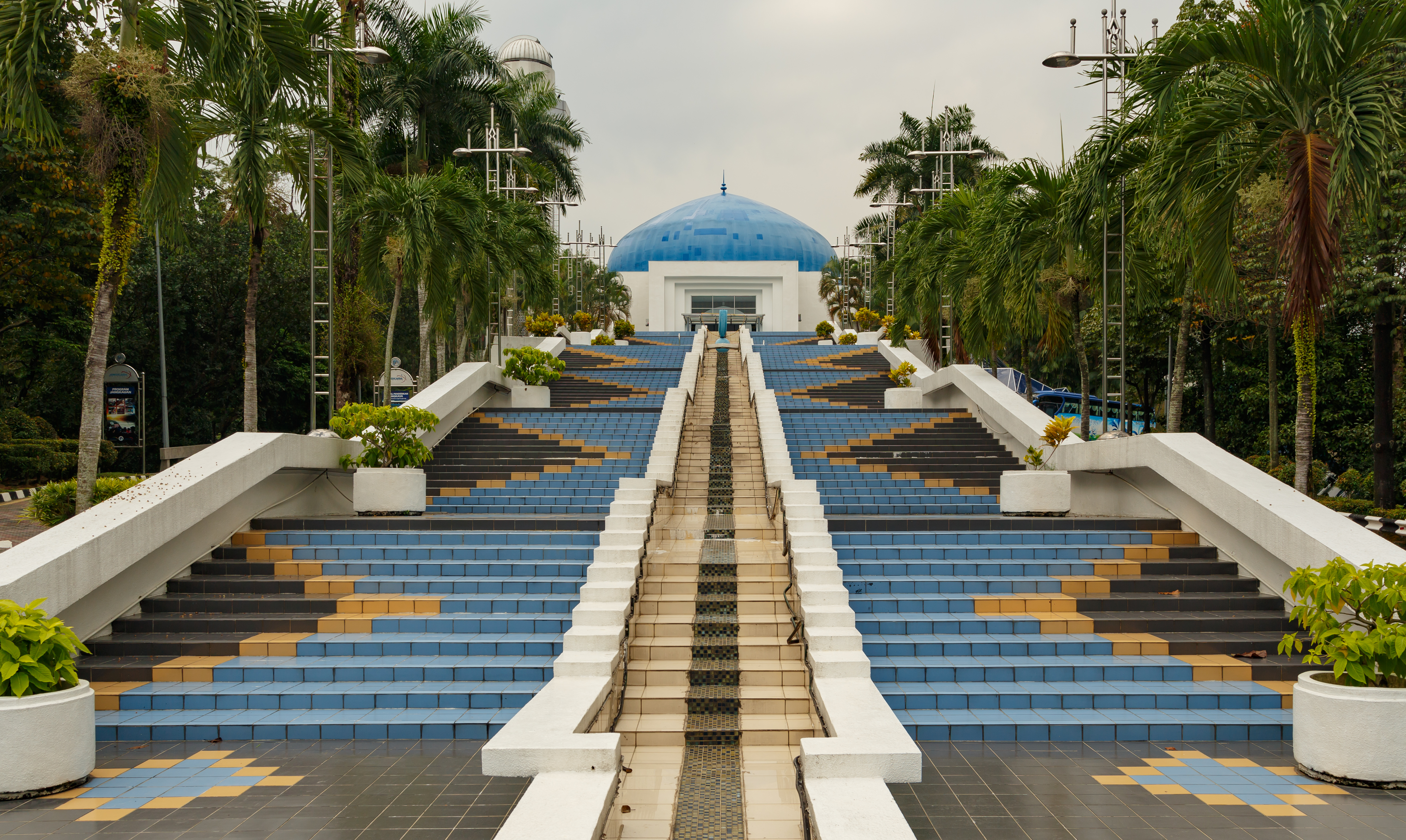
The Planetarium Negara in Kuala Lumpur was officially opened on 7 February 1994.

== Incumbent political figures ==
=== Federal level ===
- Yang di-Pertuan Agong:
  - Sultan Azlan Shah (until 25 April)
  - Tuanku Jaafar (from 26 April)
- Raja Permaisuri Agong:
  - Tuanku Bainun (until 25 April)
  - Tuanku Najihah (from 26 April)
- Prime Minister: Dato' Sri Dr Mahathir Mohamad
- Deputy Prime Minister: Dato' Sri Anwar Ibrahim
- Chief Justice: Abdul Hamid Omar then Eusoff Chin

=== State level ===
- Sultan of Johor: Sultan Iskandar
- Sultan of Kedah: Sultan Abdul Halim Muadzam Shah
- Sultan of Kelantan: Sultan Ismail Petra
- Raja of Perlis: Tuanku Syed Putra
- Sultan of Perak: Raja Nazrin Shah (Regent until 25 April)
- Sultan of Pahang: Sultan Ahmad Shah
- Sultan of Selangor: Sultan Salahuddin Abdul Aziz Shah (Deputy Yang Dipertuan Agong)
- Sultan of Terengganu: Sultan Mahmud Al-Muktafi Billah Shah
- Yang di-Pertuan Besar of Negeri Sembilan: Tunku Naquiyuddin (Regent)
- Yang di-Pertua Negeri (Governor) of Penang: Tun Dr Hamdan Sheikh Tahir
- Yang di-Pertua Negeri (Governor) of Malacca: Tun Syed Ahmad Al-Haj bin Syed Mahmud Shahabuddin
- Yang di-Pertua Negeri (Governor) of Sarawak: Tun Ahmad Zaidi Adruce Mohammed Noor
- Yang di-Pertua Negeri (Governor) of Sabah: Tun Said Keruak

== Events ==
- 1 January – Visit Malaysia Year 1994 officially began.
- 1 January – Johor Bahru granted city status.
- 15 January – Tun Mohamad Haniff Omar retired, after 20 years as the Inspector General of Police.
- January – Construction of the Bakun Dam in Sarawak commenced.
- February – Proton Saga Iswara cars are used as taxicabs in Kuala Lumpur, replacing Isuzu taxicabs.
- 7 February – The Planetarium Negara (National Planetarium) in Kuala Lumpur officially opened.
- 1 March – RTM TV1 and TV3 began its full daytime broadcasts while TV Pendidikan began broadcasting exclusively on RTM TV2.
- 8–10 April – 1994 Malaysian motorcycle Grand Prix
- 26 April – Tuanku Jaafar of Negeri Sembilan elected as the Yang di-Pertuan Agong.
- May – The Perodua Kancil, Malaysia's first compact car launched.
- 13 May – Two Malaysian peacekeeper Major Ariffin Zakaria and Major Ramli Shaari were killed in action (KIA) in the former Yugoslavia.
- 1 June – TV3 celebrates its tenth anniversary.
- 19 June – TV3 revamp the channel for a new look.
  - Berita TV3/TV3 News revamp the channel for a new look.
  - The 7 O'Clock News was renamed "TV3 Evening News" and became a late news bulletin on TV3; aired daily at 22:30 MST.
- June – The piling work for the Petronas Twin Towers was completed.
- 16 July – The Shah Alam Stadium, the biggest stadium in Malaysia, was officially opened by Sultan Salahuddin Abdul Aziz Shah of Selangor.
- 31 August – biggest heist in Malaysia prepared by Mamak Gang at the Subang International Airport
- September – The Rakan Muda youth program launched.
- 8 September – All sections of North–South Expressway were opened to traffic.
- 21 October – The Al-Arqam Islamic religious movement was banned by the federal government. More than five Al-Arqam members including Ashaari Mohammad (leader of movement) were arrested under Internal Security Act (ISA) in the main camp at Kampung Sungai Penchala, Kuala Lumpur.
- November – Puspakom, Malaysia's first computerized vehicle test centre, was introduced.
- 10 November – The Tunku Abdul Rahman Memorial was officially opened.
- 24 November – Proton Satria, Malaysia's hatchback car, launched.
- December – Internet was introduced to Malaysia for the first time.

== Births ==
- 8 March – Nurul Elfira Loy – Actress
- 10 March – Raja Ahmad Nazim Azlan Shah – Raja Kecil Negeri Perak
- 4 April – Azroy Hazalwafie – Weightlifter
- 3 May – Farah Ann Abdul Hadi – Gymnast
- 5 May – Hafizh Syahrin – Motorcycle racer
- 4 June – Aznil Bidin – Weightlifter
- 11 June – Mohd Ridzuan Abdunloh – Footballer
- 2 July – Muhammad Hadin Azman – Footballer
- 12 July – Bonnie Loo – Singer-actress
- 23 July – Putera Alam Shah – Malaysia YouTuber and TikToker and Jenna Ortega fans
- 30 July – Nelydia Senrose – Actress
- 7 September – Joey Leong – Actress
- 30 September – Nik Adruce – Actor
- 7 October – Muhammad Syazwan Tajuddin – Footballer
- 13 November – Lim Yin Fun – Badminton player
- 28 November – Faizat Ghazli – Footballer

== Deaths ==
- 31 January – Zain Mahmood – Author and screenwriter of Malay film Fenomena (born 1933)
- 19 April – Tun Osman Mohd Jewa – First Malaysian armed forces general (born 1919)
- 11 September – Tan Sri Mubin Sheppard – Malaysian culture and heritage historian (born 1905)

== See also ==
- 1994
- 1993 in Malaysia | 1995 in Malaysia
- History of Malaysia
