= 1997 in Malaysia =

- Decades: 1970s; 1980s; 1990s; 2000s; 2010s
- See also: Other events of 1997; History of Malaysia • Timeline • Years

This article lists important figures and events in Malaysian public affairs during the year 1997, together with births and deaths of notable Malaysians.

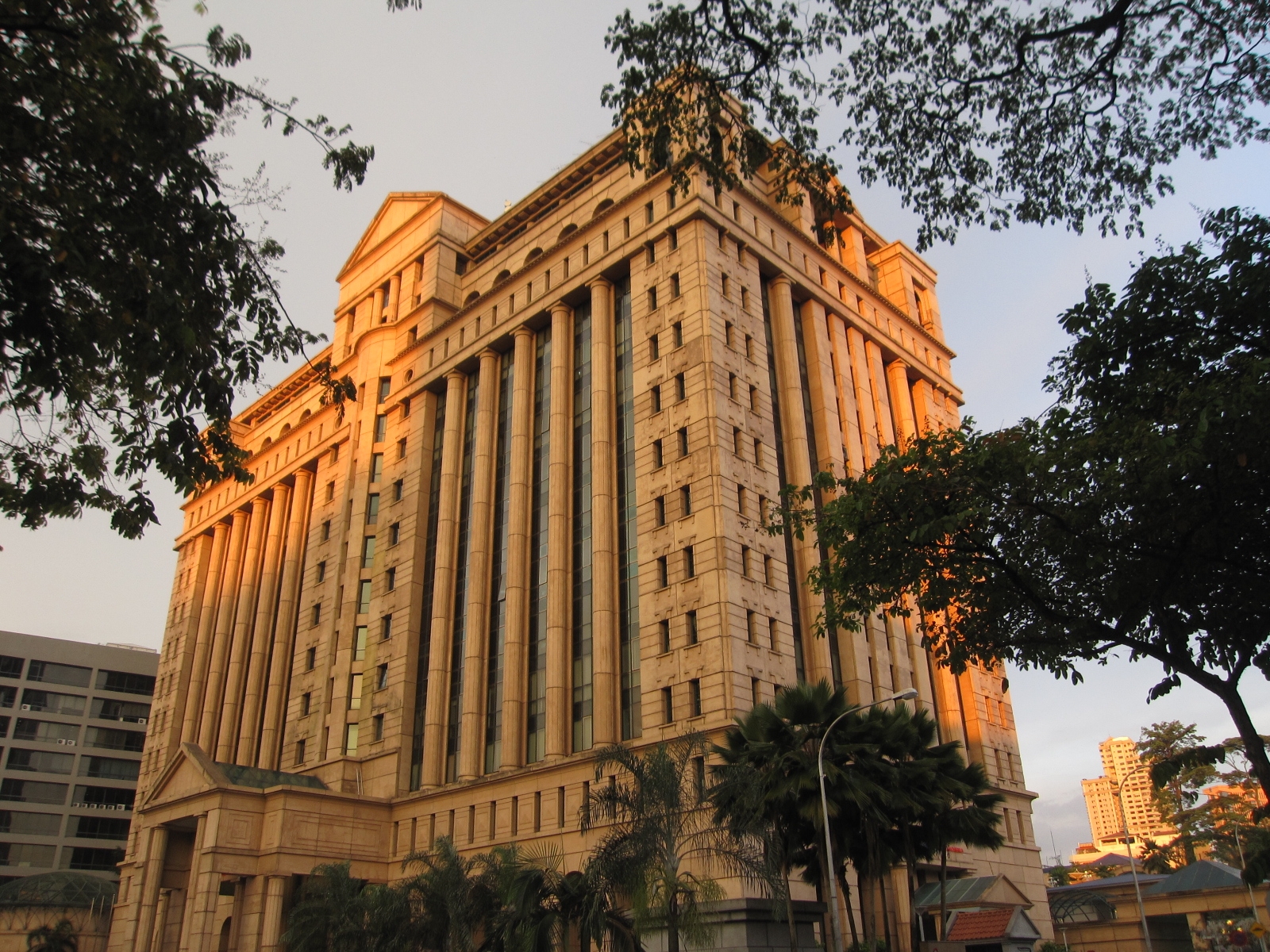
Exchange Square, the headquarters of Bursa Malaysia

Jalur Gemilang, the Malaysian flag

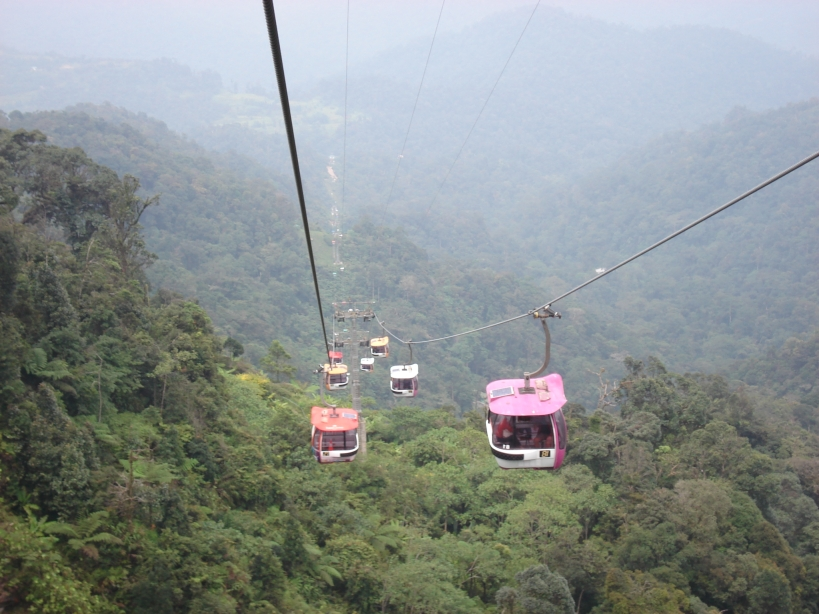
Genting Skyway.

== Incumbent political figures ==
=== Federal level ===
- Yang di-Pertuan Agong: Tuanku Jaafar
- Raja Permaisuri Agong: Tuanku Najihah
- Prime Minister: Dato' Sri Dr Mahathir Mohamad
- Deputy Prime Minister: Dato' Sri Anwar Ibrahim
- Chief Justice: Eusoff Chin

=== State level ===
- Sultan of Johor: Sultan Iskandar
- Sultan of Kedah: Sultan Abdul Halim Muadzam Shah
- Sultan of Kelantan: Sultan Ismail Petra
- Raja of Perlis: Tuanku Syed Putra
- Sultan of Perak: Sultan Azlan Shah
- Sultan of Pahang: Sultan Ahmad Shah
- Sultan of Selangor: Sultan Salahuddin Abdul Aziz Shah (Deputy Yang di-Pertuan Agong)
- Sultan of Terengganu: Sultan Mahmud Al-Muktafi Billah Shah
- Yang di-Pertuan Besar of Negeri Sembilan: Tunku Naquiyuddin (Regent)
- Yang di-Pertua Negeri (Governor) of Penang: Tun Dr Hamdan Sheikh Tahir
- Yang di-Pertua Negeri (Governor) of Malacca: Tun Syed Ahmad Al-Haj bin Syed Mahmud Shahabuddin
- Yang di-Pertua Negeri (Governor) of Sarawak: Tun Ahmad Zaidi Adruce Mohammed Noor
- Yang di-Pertua Negeri (Governor) of Sabah: Tun Sakaran Dandai

== Events ==
- 1 January – Petronas Twin Towers (452 metres) became the world's tallest buildings.
- 1 January – Visit Terengganu Year 1997 officially began.
- 1 January – Compulsory self-service at petrol stations in Klang Valley came into operation for the first time.
- 3 January – The Proton Putra, Malaysia's first coupé car was launched.
- 10 January – Universiti Teknologi Petronas (UTP) was established.
- 1 February – Genting Skyway, the longest cable car in South East Asia was opened.
- 3 February – The opening of the Aborigines Museum in Ayer Keroh, Malacca.
- 2 March – The Chairman of DRB Hicom Group, Tan Sri Yahaya Ahmad and his wife Puan Sri Rohana Othman were killed in a helicopter crash in Kuala Lipis, Pahang.
- 4–15 March – 1997 Men's Hockey World Cup Qualifier in Kuala Lumpur
- 12 March – Seeking to prevent a serious rift in relations with Malaysia, Lee Kuan Yew, Singapore's senior minister, apologized "unreservedly" for remarks that brought a storm of protest from Malaysians.
- 18 March – The Touch 'n Go Electronic Payment System (EPS) was launched.
- 3 April – Universiti Pertanian Malaysia (UPM) changed its name to Universiti Putra Malaysia
- 11-13 April – 1997 Malaysian motorcycle Grand Prix
- 17 May – Official launching of Cyberjaya by the prime minister Mahathir Mohamad.
- 23 May – M. Magendran (11.55 am) and N. Mohanadas (12.10 pm) were the first Malaysians to reach the peak of Mount Everest.
- 14 June – Lim Kit Siang lodged a police report with the Anti-Corruption Agency headquarters, Jalan Duta, asking for full investigations as to how Ling Hee Leong, son of MCA President and Transport Minister, Ling Liong Sik, could at the age of 27 embark on corporate acquisitions exceeding RM1.2 billion in a matter of months and whether there had been improper use and influence of his father's political and Ministerial position.
- 14 June – A Bell 206L-4 helicopter broke up and crashed at the Bandar Sri Damansara light industrial area, Selangor killing three on board the aircraft and two on the ground.
- 16 June–5 July – The FIFA World Youth Championship was held in Malaysia. Argentina won the World Youth Championship after beating Uruguay 2–1 in the final at Shah Alam Stadium.
- July – Sunway Pyramid, Subang Jaya's new attraction was officially opened.
- 13 July – Official opening of the Exchange Square, the new headquarters of the Kuala Lumpur Stock Exchange (KLSE).
- 21 July – Economic crisis in Malaysia. The Kuala Lumpur Stock Exchange (KLSE) Composite Index fell below 200 points.
- 3 August – 1997 Southeast Asian haze:
  - A state of emergency was imposed in Kuching, Sarawak after the Air Pollution Index reached "extreme".
- 31 August – The flag of Malaysia is renamed Jalur Gemilang.
- 27 September – 1997 Southeast Asian haze:
  - Twenty-nine crewmen were missing, some people trapped in an Indian Vikraman cargo ship when it ship collided with a Caribbean Mount 1 supertanker in the Strait of Malacca near Port Dickson, Negeri Sembilan.
- 6 October – The Malaysian Exchange of Securities Dealing & Automated Quotation (MESDAQ) was launched.
- 11 October – The national IT (information technology) campaign, themed "IT As A Culture", was launched by prime minister Mahathir Mohamad and aired live at 8:30 pm on all television and radio stations in the country.
- 14 October – Former president of the Architect Malaysia Association (PAM), Henry Lee Inn Seong, told the Kuala Lumpur Coronary Court that the planner of the collapsed Highland Towers apartment block had no qualification for a 12-storey building. He said the planner, Wong Tin Sang, only had the qualifications to build a building not more than 300 square meters or 3,000 square feet and not more than two floors.
- 28 October – The Seventh Non-Aligned Summit Meeting G15 was held in Kuala Lumpur.
- 14 November – Coroner Mohd Radhi Abas of the Kuala Lumpur Coronary Court ruled that the Highland Towers tragedy was not due to any crime and natural disaster, but was a series of crashes and multiple injuries that hit them after the apartment collapsed. It "is not a natural disaster".
- 19 December – Ten Malaysians died when SilkAir Flight 185 from Jakarta, Indonesia to Singapore crashed into the Musi River near Palembang, Sumatra, Indonesia killing all 97 passengers and seven crew on board.

== Births ==
- 2 January – Badrul Hisyam Abdul Manap – Runner athlete
- 8 January – Danial Asyraf Abdullah – Footballer
- 26 January – Nik Azli Nik Alias – Footballer
- 5 March – Safawi Rasid – Footballer
- 27 March – Danial Amier Norhisham – Footballer
- 29 March – Welson Sim – Swimmer
- 31 March – Abdul Latif Romly – Long jumper
- 26 May – Julian Yee, Figure skater
- 11 June – Jafri Firdaus Chew – Footballer
- 1 October – Syamer Kutty Abba – Footballer
- 24 October – Farhanna Qismina – Actress

== Deaths ==
- 21 February – Datuk Mohamed Nasir, 6th Menteri Besar of Kelantan (b. 1916).
- 2 March – Tan Sri Yahaya Ahmad, Chairman of DRB Hicom Group (b. 1947).
- 31 March – Tan Sri Datuk Amar Stephen Kalong Ningkan, 1st Chief Minister of Sarawak (b. 1920).
- 10 April – Ong Tin Kim, GERAKAN Member of Parliament for Telok Intan (b. 1938).
- 14 May – Datuk Seri Mohd Zin Abdul Ghani, 7th Chief Minister of Malacca (b. 1941).

== See also ==
- 1997
- 1996 in Malaysia | 1998 in Malaysia
- History of Malaysia
