= 1995 in Malaysia =

- Decades: 1970s; 1980s; 1990s; 2000s; 2010s
- See also: Other events of 1995; History of Malaysia • Timeline • Years

This article lists important figures and events in Malaysian public affairs during the year 1995, together with births and deaths of notable Malaysians.

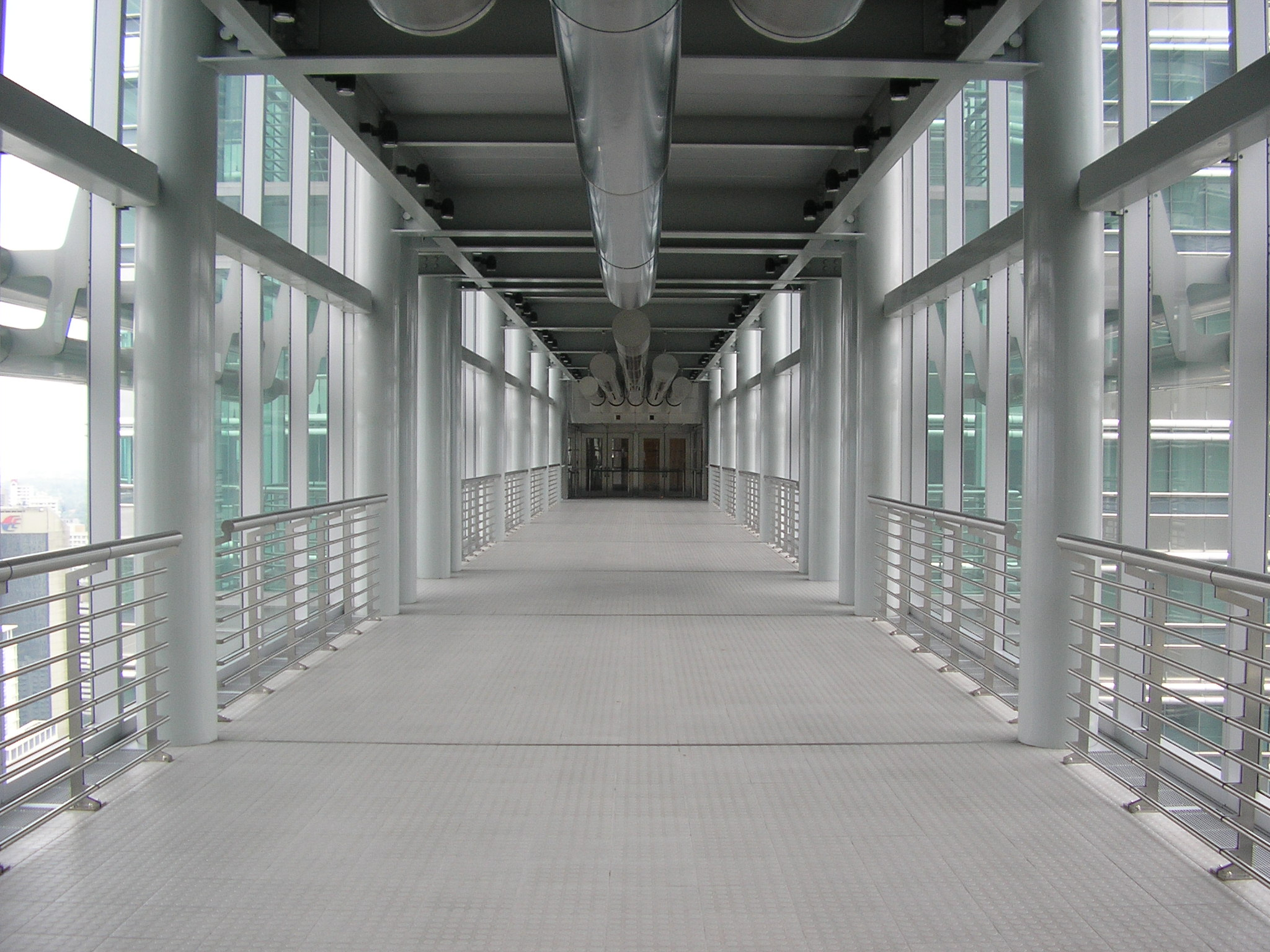
A skybridge at Petronas Twin Towers.

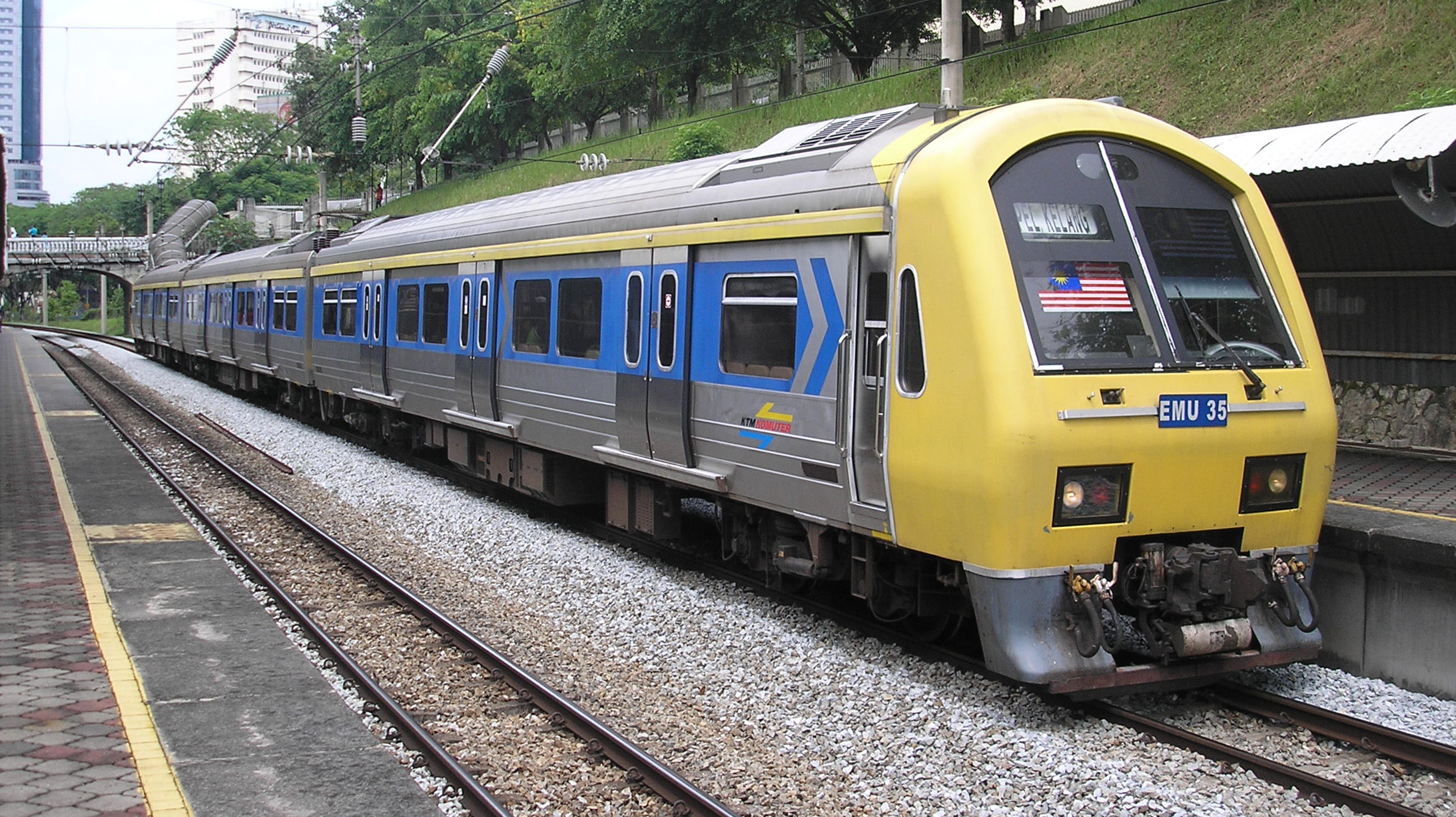
A KTM Komuter Class 83 EMU at Bank Negara station.

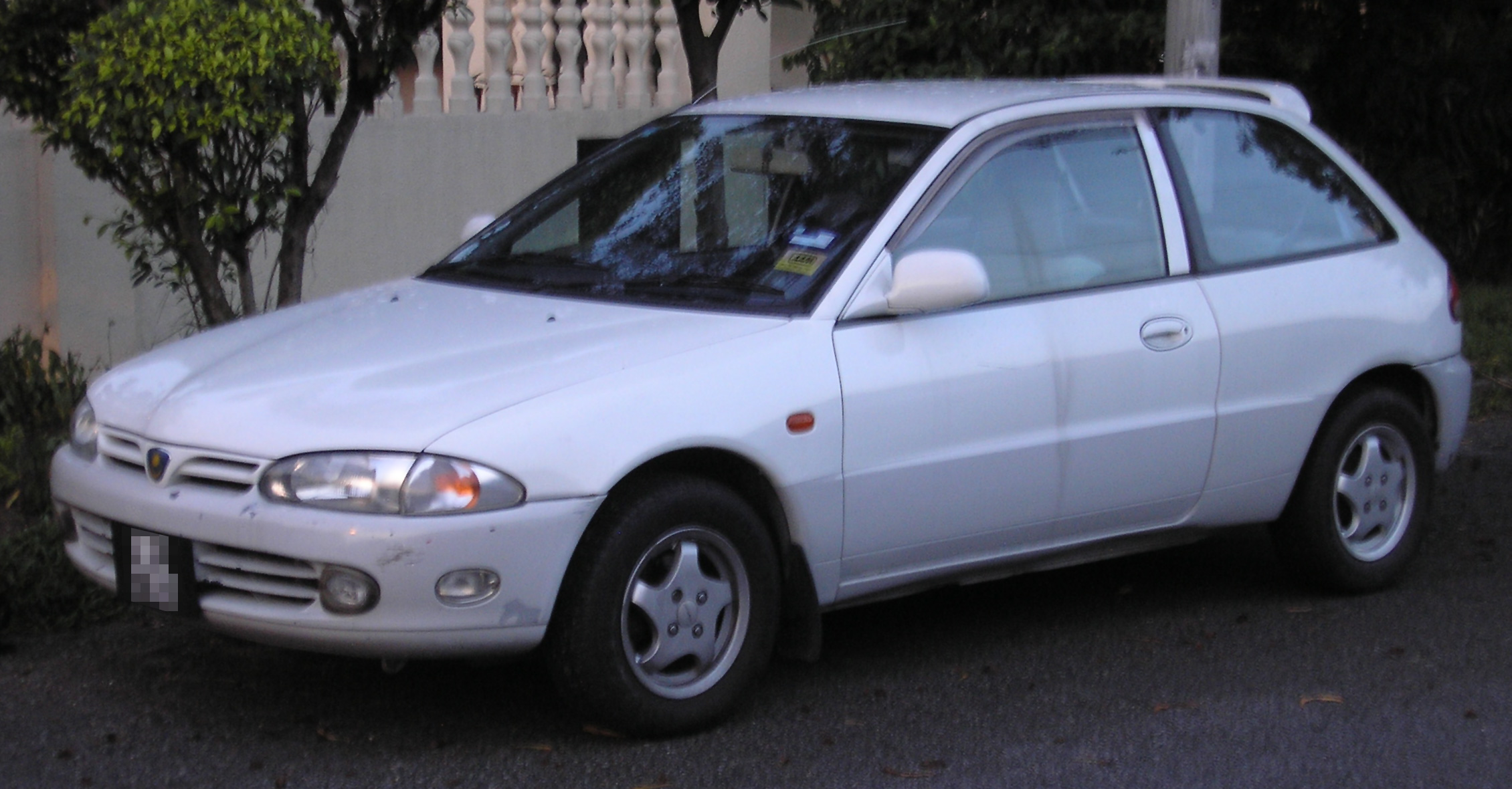
Proton Satria.

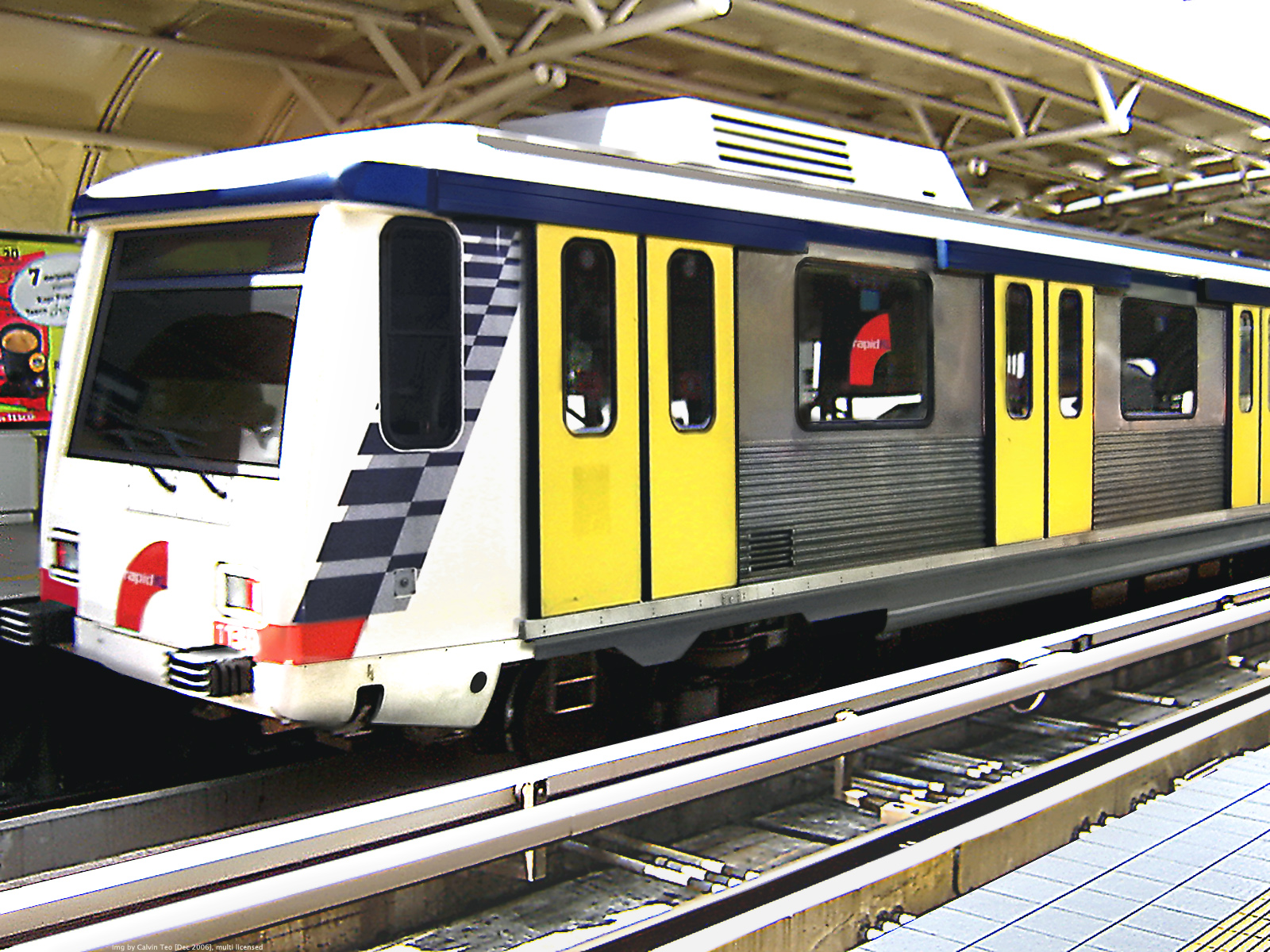
A Star LRT train at the Masjid Jamek LRT station.

== Incumbent political figures ==
=== Federal level ===
- Yang di-Pertuan Agong: Tuanku Jaafar
- Raja Permaisuri Agong: Tuanku Najihah
- Prime Minister: Dato' Sri Dr Mahathir Mohamad
- Deputy Prime Minister: Dato' Sri Anwar Ibrahim
- Chief Justice: Eusoff Chin

=== State level ===
- Sultan of Johor: Sultan Iskandar
- Sultan of Kedah: Sultan Abdul Halim Muadzam Shah
- Sultan of Kelantan: Sultan Ismail Petra
- Raja of Perlis: Tuanku Syed Putra
- Sultan of Perak: Sultan Azlan Shah
- Sultan of Pahang: Sultan Ahmad Shah
- Sultan of Selangor: Sultan Salahuddin Abdul Aziz Shah (Deputy Yang di-Pertuan Agong)
- Sultan of Terengganu: Sultan Mahmud Al-Muktafi Billah Shah
- Yang di-Pertuan Besar of Negeri Sembilan: Tunku Naquiyuddin (Regent)
- Yang di-Pertua Negeri (Governor) of Penang: Tun Dr Hamdan Sheikh Tahir
- Yang di-Pertua Negeri (Governor) of Malacca: Tun Syed Ahmad Al-Haj bin Syed Mahmud Shahabuddin
- Yang di-Pertua Negeri (Governor) of Sarawak: Tun Ahmad Zaidi Adruce Mohammed Noor
- Yang di-Pertua Negeri (Governor) of Sabah: Tun Sakaran Dandai

== Events ==
- 1 January – The display of cigarette packets in advertisements was banned by the Malaysian federal government.
- 26 January – The Proton Perdana, Malaysia's first luxury car was launched.
- March – The skybridge of the Petronas Twin Towers opened to the public.
- 31 March–2 April – 1995 Malaysian motorcycle Grand Prix
- 1 April – Malaysian singer, Siti Nurhaliza won Bintang HMI.
- 26 April – The 1995 General Elections. Barisan Nasional (BN) won this election.
- 29 June – 20 people were killed in the landslide at Genting Highlands slip road near the Karak Highway.
- July – The Tengku Tengah Zaharah Mosque in Kuala Terengganu was fully constructed. This was the first floating mosque in Malaysia.
- 10 July – Tun Dr Mahathir Mohamad celebrated his 70th birthday.
- 3 August – The KTM Komuter, Malaysia's first electrified commuter train service began operation.
- 15 September – 34 people were killed and 19 survived when Malaysia Airlines Flight 2133, a Fokker 50 plane, crashed near Tawau Airport in Tawau, Sabah after a failed go-around.
- October – Amanah Saham Wawasan 2020 (ASW 2020) was launched.
- 19 October – The new federal administrative centre of Putrajaya was established.
- 20 October – The Sumur City Aerospace Adventure exhibition was held in Sumur City, Shah Alam.
- 29 November – Sabah Air Helicopter carrying eleven Petronas workers crashed into the Samarang Sea.
- 12 December – The STAR Light Rail Transit (LRT) (Light Rail Transit) began operations in Kuala Lumpur. It was the first LRT system in the city.

== Births ==
- 3 January – Muhd Nor Azam Abdul Azih – Footballer
- 1 February – Zahirah MacWilson – Actress
- 15 February – Adib Zainudin – Footballer
- 24 February – Syazwan Zaipol Bahari – Footballer
- 25 February – Thanabalan Nadarajah – Footballer
- 21 April – Sharifah Aryana – Actress
- 5 May – Amirul Hisyam Awang Kechik – Footballer
- 23 May – Najwa Latif – Singer
- 1 June – Janna Nick – Actress and singer
- 4 June – Irfan Zakaria – Footballer
- 28 June – Syafiq Ahmad – Footballer
- 4 August – Soo Teck Zhi – Badminton player
- 16 August – Irfan Shamshuddin – Discus thrower
- 6 September – Seow Sin Nee – Malaysian-born Singaporean Actress
- 16 October – Chew Yiwei – Diver
- 20 October – Amelia Thripura Henderson – Actress
- 22 December – Sam Jee Lek – Dancer
- Unknown date – Aminulrasyid Amzah – student (died 2010)

== Deaths ==
- 2 January – Mustapha Harun, 1st Yang di-Pertuan Negeri of Sabah, 3rd Chief Minister of Sabah and the Father Of Violin (b. 1918).
- 16 February – Tan Sri Dato' Loh Boon Siew, tycoon and first sole distributor of Honda motorcycles in Malaysia (b. 1915).
- 18 March – Tun Ahmad Rafee, 2nd Yang di-Pertua Negeri of Sabah (b. 1908).
- 16 June – Senu Abdul Rahman, former USM Vice Chancellor and Malaysian ambassador to United Nations (b. 1919).
- 12 July – P. Patto, DAP Member of Parliament for Bagan (b. 1946).
- 17 November – Tun Said Keruak, 4th Chief Minister of Sabah and 7th Yang di-Pertuan Negeri of Sabah (b. 1925).

== See also ==
- 1995
- 1994 in Malaysia | 1996 in Malaysia
- History of Malaysia
