= 1999 in Malaysia =

- Decades: 1970s; 1980s; 1990s; 2000s; 2010s
- See also: Other events of 1999; History of Malaysia • Timeline • Years

This article lists important figures and events in Malaysian public affairs during the year 1999, together with births and deaths of notable Malaysians.

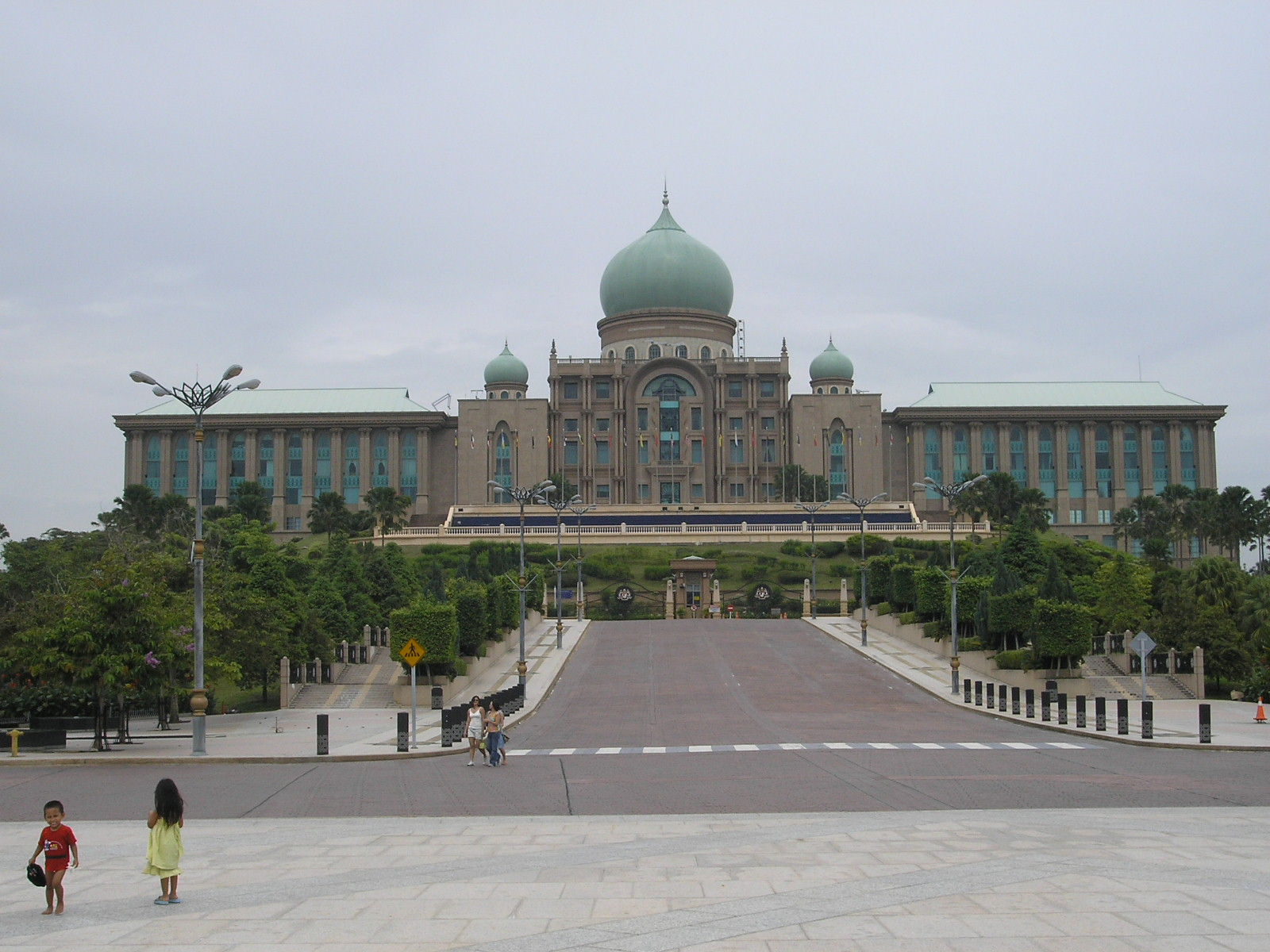
The Prime Minister's office at Perdana Putra, Putrajaya

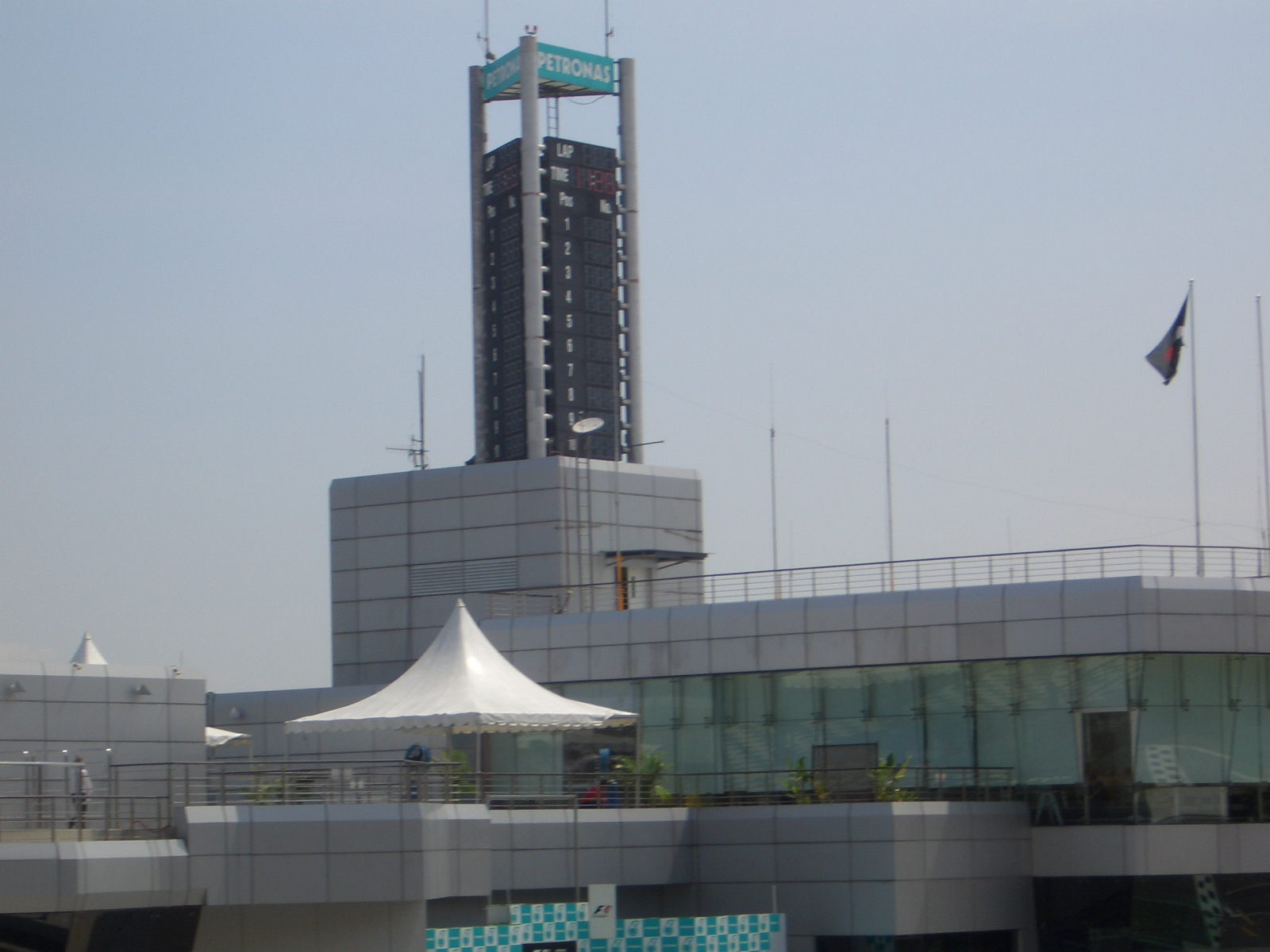
The leader board at the Sepang International Circuit.

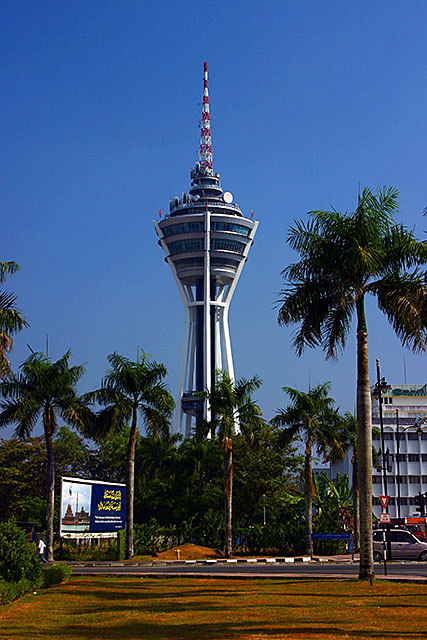
Menara Alor Star

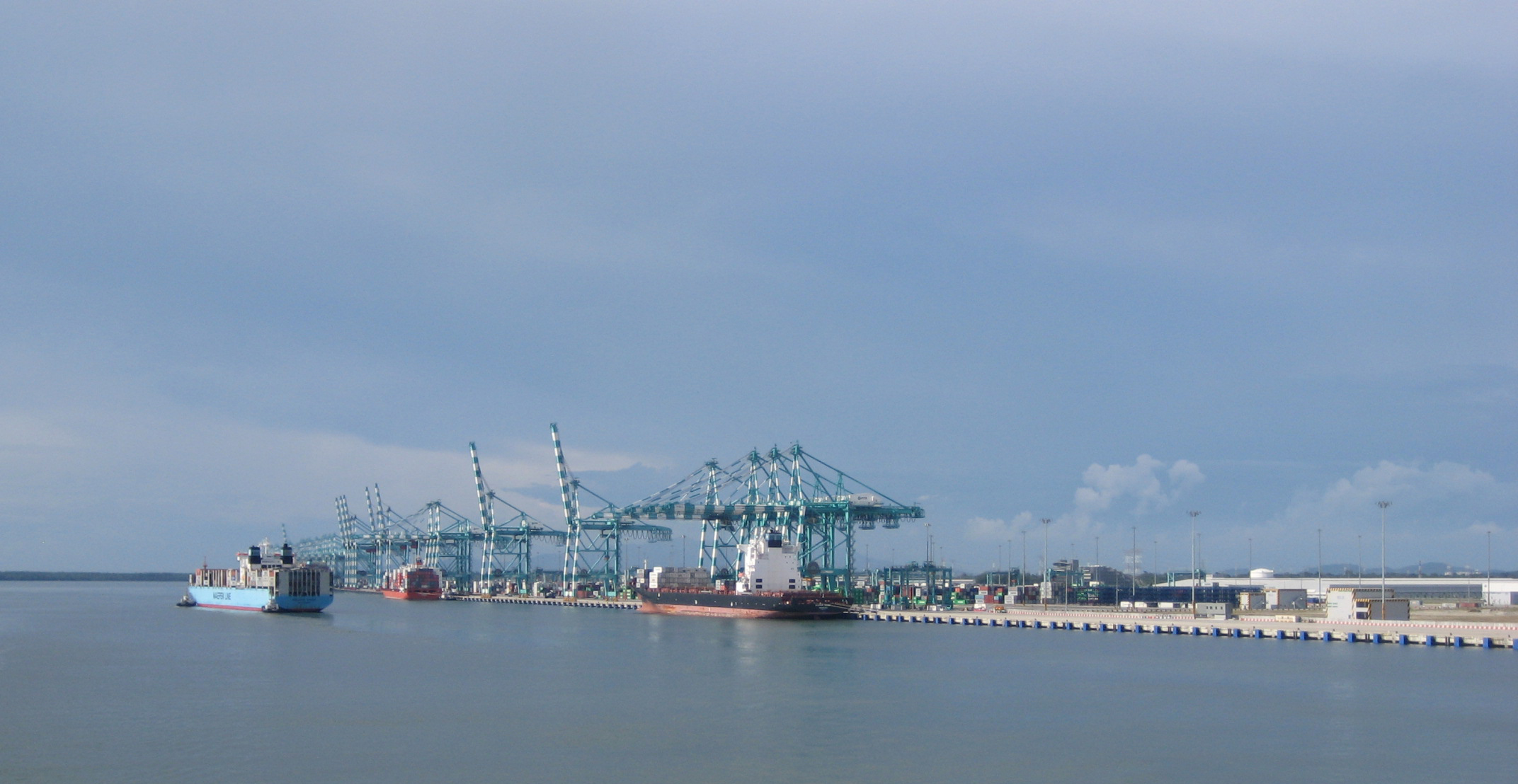
The port of Tanjung Pelepas, Malaysia.

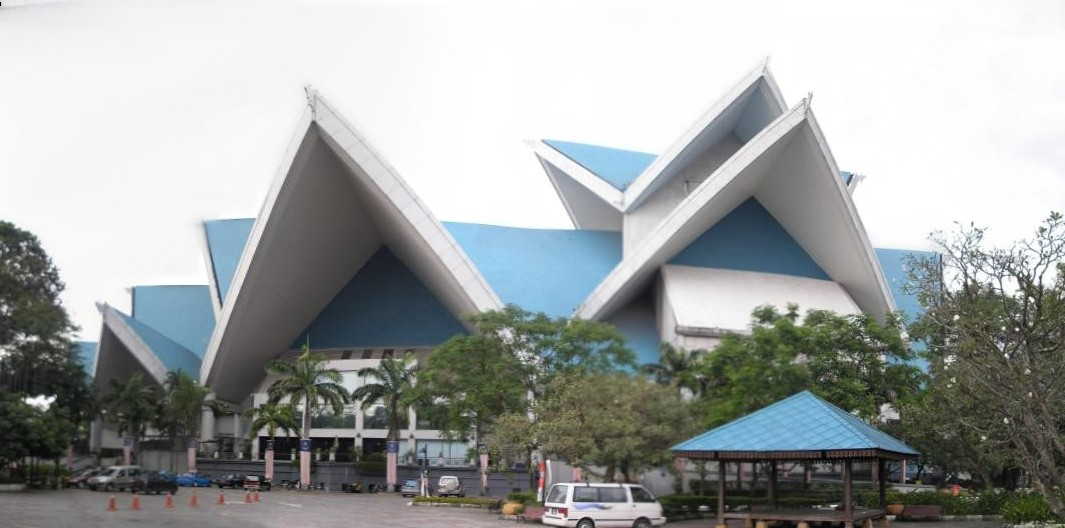
Istana Budaya in Kuala Lumpur

== Incumbent political figures ==
=== Federal level ===
- Yang di-Pertuan Agong:
  - Tuanku Jaafar (until 25 April)
  - Sultan Salahuddin Abdul Aziz Shah (from 26 April)
- Raja Permaisuri Agong:
  - Tuanku Najihah (until 25 April)
  - Tuanku Siti Aishah (from 26 April)
- Prime Minister: Dato' Sri Dr Mahathir Mohamad
- Deputy Prime Minister:
  - Dato' Sri Anwar Ibrahim (until February)
  - Dato' Sri Abdullah Ahmad Badawi (from February)
- Chief Justice: Eusoff Chin

=== State level ===
- Sultan of Johor: Sultan Iskandar
- Sultan of Kedah: Sultan Abdul Halim Muadzam Shah
- Sultan of Kelantan of Kelantan: Sultan Ismail Petra
- Raja of Perlis: Tuanku Syed Putra
- Sultan of Perak: Sultan Azlan Shah
- Sultan of Pahang: Sultan Ahmad Shah
- Sultan of Selangor: Tengku Idris Shah (Regent from 26 April)
- Sultan of Terengganu: Sultan Mizan Zainal Abidin (Deputy Yang di-Pertuan Agong)
- Yang di-Pertuan Besar of Negeri Sembilan: Tunku Naquiyuddin (Regent until 25 April)
- Yang di-Pertua Negeri (Governor) of Penang: Tun Dr Hamdan Sheikh Tahir
- Yang di-Pertua Negeri (Governor) of Malacca: Tun Syed Ahmad Al-Haj bin Syed Mahmud Shahabuddin
- Yang di-Pertua Negeri (Governor) of Sarawak: Tun Ahmad Zaidi Adruce Mohammed Noor
- Yang di-Pertua Negeri (Governor) of Sabah: Tun Sakaran Dandai

== Events ==
- 1 January – Visit Negeri Sembilan Year 1999 officially began
- January – Malaysia exited from economic crisis
- 15 January – Tan Sri Abdul Rahim Noor resigned as the Inspector General of Police after taking full responsibility for injuries suffered by former Deputy Prime Minister, Anwar Ibrahim while in police custody.
- February – Abdullah Ahmad Badawi became Deputy Prime Minister, replacing Dato' Seri Anwar Ibrahim.
- 3 March – Many federal administration sections were moved to the new federal administrative centre in Putrajaya, but Kuala Lumpur remained the capital.
- 4 March – Sultan Mizan Zainal Abidin was crowned as Sultan of Terengganu.
- 10 March – Baby dugong, Si Tenang was found dead by a fisherman in Pasir Gudang, Johor.
- 15 March – The Smart TAG on-board unit (OBU) was launched, replacing PLUS TAG
- 4 April – Parti Keadilan Nasional (Keadilan) was launched.
- 14 April – Dato' Seri Anwar Ibrahim was found guilty of corruption and sentenced to six years in jail.
- 16-18 April – 1999 Malaysian motorcycle Grand Prix
- 19 April – Two brothers, Justin Read, 19 and Gerald Read, 25 were the first Malaysians to reach the North Pole after encountering challenging weather.
- 20 April – The Sepang International Circuit, Malaysia's home of motorsports was officially opened.
- 26 April – Sultan Salahuddin Abdul Aziz Shah of Selangor was elected as the 11th Yang di-Pertuan Agong.
- 15 May – A landslide near Bukit Antarabangsa, Ulu Klang, Selangor. Most of the Bukit Antarabangsa civilians were trapped.
- 21 May – Sun Cruises' liner SS Galileo Galilei or also known as SS Sun Vista sank in the Straits of Malacca near Penang after the vessel suffered an engine room fire, which cut all power. All 1,090 passengers and crew were safely evacuated.
- 1 June – Section 2 of the PUTRA-LRT from Masjid Jamek to Gombak opened, containing Malaysia's first underground rail line.
- 21 June – Prime Minister, Mahathir Mohamad moved into new office at the Perdana Putra building in the new federal administrative centre in Putrajaya.
- 8 July – The official opening ceremony for the Multimedia Super Corridor (MSC) centre in Cyberjaya.
- 10 August – Azhar Mansor becomes the first Malaysian solo sailor to sail around the world by Jalur Gemilang sailing ship.
- 23 August – The establishment of University of Selangor in Selangor.
- 26 August – The Institut Teknologi MARA (ITM) was given its university status and renamed Universiti Teknologi MARA (UiTM).
- 31 August – Petronas Twin Towers, Kuala Lumpur City Centre, Federal Territory of Kuala Lumpur officially formally formal grand opening inaugurating launching ceremonial took place began largest city and national capital, nationally and internationally by the 4th Prime Minister of Malaysia, Mahathir bin Mohamad in conjunction marking with Petroliam Nasional Berhad (Petronas) celebrated its twenty-fifth year of anniversary in silver jubilee anniversary party theme and Malaysia's celebrated its forty-second Independence Day on 31 August 1999.
- September – Opening of the Istana Budaya in Kuala Lumpur.
- September – The Bintang Walk at Bukit Bintang was officially opened.
- 11 September – Sultan Salahuddin Abdul Aziz Shah of Selangor was installed as Yang di-Pertuan Agong.
- 1 October – Bank of Commerce merged with Bank Bumiputra Malaysia Berhad and changed its name to Bumiputra-Commerce Bank Berhad.
- 10 October – Opening of the Port of Tanjung Pelepas in Johor.
- 17 October – The first Formula One Petronas Malaysian Grand Prix held at the Sepang International Circuit.
- 25 October – Barisan Nasional celebrated its 25th anniversary.
- 18 November – Mid Valley Megamall, the largest shopping complex in Malaysia was officially opened.
- 18–21 November - World Cup Golf Malaysia 1999
- 29 November – The 1999 General Elections. PAS took over State of Terengganu government by majority.
- 22 December – A Mutiara express bus caught fire after plunging into a ravine at Kampung Bayu in Paloh, near Gua Musang, Kelantan killing three passengers and injuring eight.

== Births ==
- 1 May – Akhyar Rashid – Footballer
- 3 June – Bonnie Bunyau Gustin – Powerlifter
- 10 June – Anwar Ibrahim – Footballer
- 10 July – Intan Serah – Footballer
- 12 July – Nur Dhabitah Sabri – Diver
- 13 July – Leong Jun Hao – Badminton Player
- 5 September – Man Wei Chong – Badminton Player
- 11 September – Nurin Jazlin – Murder victim (died 2007)
- 24 November – Muhammad Erry Hidayat – Weightlifter

== Deaths ==
- 2 February – Tunku Puan Besar Kurshiah, Tunku Ampuan Besar Negeri Sembilan and first Raja Permaisuri Agong (b. 1911).
- 2 March – Clarence Elong Mansul, former BERJAYA Member of Parliament for Penampang, Sabah (b. 1940).
- 23 June – Aziz Ishak, freedom fighter, politician and journalist (b. 1915).
- 15 July – Lee An Tong, Deputy Secretary-General of the Malayan Communist Party (b. 1917).
- 31 October – Alex Lee Yu Lung, former Gerakan Member of Parliament for Batu (b. 1939).
- 26 December – Along, vocalist of Spoon band and murder victim (b. 1980).

== See also ==
- 1999
- 1998 in Malaysia | 2000 in Malaysia
- History of Malaysia
