= 2002 in Malaysia =

- Decades: 1980s; 1990s; 2000s; 2010s; 2020s
- See also: Other events of 2002; History of Malaysia • Timeline • Years

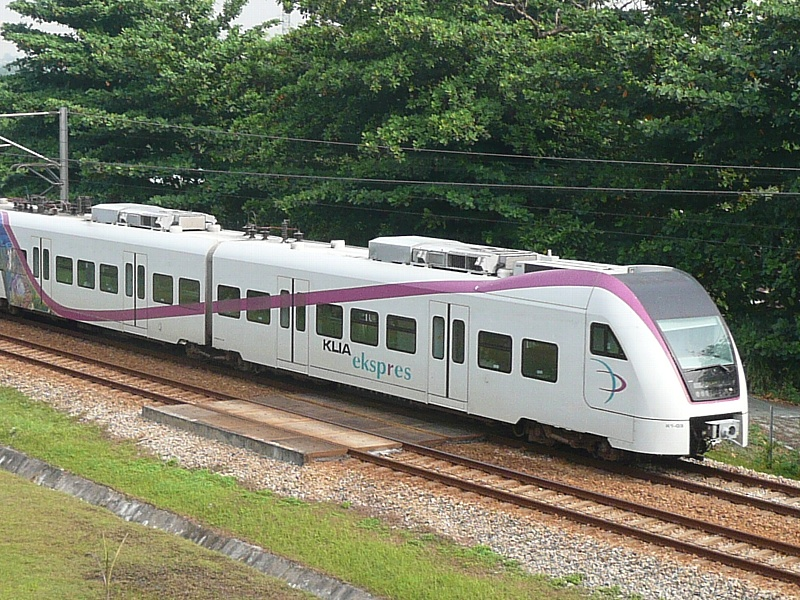
KLIA Ekspres on the Express Rail Link (ERL).

This article lists important figures and events in Malaysian public affairs during the year 2002, together with births and deaths of notable Malaysians. 2002 marked is 45th anniversary of Malaysia's Independence.

== Incumbent political figures ==
=== Federal level ===
- Yang di-Pertuan Agong: Tuanku Syed Sirajuddin of Perlis
- Raja Permaisuri Agong: Tengku Fauziah of Perlis
- Deputy Yang di-Pertuan Agong: Sultan Mizan Zainal Abidin of Terengganu
- Prime Minister: Tun Dr. Mahathir Mohamad
- Deputy Prime Minister: Dato' Sri Abdullah Ahmad Badawi
- President of the Dewan Negara: Tun Tan Sri Michael Chen Wing Sum
- Speaker of the Dewan Rakyat: Tun Dr. Mohamed Zahir Ismail
- Chief Justice: Mohamed Dzaiddin Abdullah

=== State level ===
- Johor:
  - Sultan of Johor: Sultan Iskandar
  - Menteri Besar of Johor: Abdul Ghani Othman
- Kedah:
  - Sultan of Kedah: Sultan Abdul Halim Mu'adzam Shah
  - Menteri Besar of Kedah: Syed Razak Syed Zain Barakbah
- Kelantan:
  - Sultan of Kelantan: Sultan Ismail Petra
  - Menteri Besar of Kelantan: Nik Abdul Aziz Nik Mat
- Perlis:
  - Raja of Perlis: Tuanku Syed Faizuddin Putra (Regent)
  - Menteri Besar of Perlis: Shahidan Kassim
- Perak:
  - Sultan of Perak: Sultan Azlan Muhibbuddin Shah
  - Menteri Besar of Perak: Tajol Rosli Mohd Ghazali
- Pahang:
  - Sultan of Pahang: Sultan Haji Ahmad Shah Al-Musta'in Billah
  - Menteri Besar of Pahang: Adnan Yaakob
- Selangor:
  - Sultan of Selangor: Sultan Sharafuddin Idris Shah
  - Menteri Besar of Selangor: Mohamad Khir Toyo
- Terengganu:
  - Sultan of Terengganu: Sultan Mizan Zainal Abidin
  - Menteri Besar of Terengganu: Abdul Hadi Awang
- Negeri Sembilan:
  - Yang di-Pertuan Besar of Negeri Sembilan: Tuanku Ja'afar
  - Menteri Besar of Negeri Sembilan: Mohd Isa Abdul Samad
- Penang:
  - Governor of Penang: Tun Abdul Rahman Abbas
  - Chief Minister of Penang: Koh Tsu Koon
- Malacca:
  - Governor of Malacca: Tun Syed Ahmad Syed Mahmud Shahabuddin
  - Chief Minister of Malacca: Mohd Ali Rustam
- Sarawak:
  - Governor of Sarawak: Tun Abang Muhammad Salahuddin
  - Chief Minister of Sarawak: Abdul Taib Mahmud
- Sabah:
  - Governor of Sabah: Tun Sakaran Dandai
  - Chief Minister of Sabah: Chong Kah Kiat

== Events ==
- 24 January – United Sabah Party rejoins the Barisan Nasional coalition.
- 1–10 February — 2002 Tour de Langkawi.
- 23 February – Malaysian Conjoined twins Ahmad and Muhammad Rosli are successfully separated at King Fahd National Guard Hospital, Saudi Arabia.
- 24 February – 9 March – The 2002 Men's Hockey World Cup is held in Kuala Lumpur.
- 14 April – The Express Rail Link, Malaysia's first high speed train, is launched.
- 15 April – Prime Minister Mahathir Mohamad leaves for Morocco on the first leg of a week-long tour which will also take him to Libya and Bahrain.
- 19 April – About fourteen more suspected hardcore Kumpulan Militan Malaysia members, including a woman, are arrested under the Internal Security Act, bringing the number of KMM members held since May 2001 to 62.
- 22 April – Tuanku Syed Sirajuddin of Perlis is installed as the 12th Yang di-Pertuan Agong.
- 1–5 May — 2002 Malaysian Paralympiad in Kuala Lumpur.
- 2 June — 2002 International Penang Bridge Run.
- 8 June – Prime Minister Mahathir Mohamad visits Vatican City and meets Pope John Paul II for the first time.
- 22 June – Prime Minister Mahathir Mohamad announces that he will resign from office and be replaced by Abdullah Ahmad Badawi.
- 23 June – Pan-Malaysian Islamic Party president Fadzil Noor dies after undergoing heart bypass surgery. He is succeeded as PAS President and leader of the opposition in Parliament by Abdul Hadi Awang.
- June – The 2002 World's Strongest Man competition is held in Kuala Lumpur.
- July – The Pendang MP by-election is won by Barisan Nasional's Othman Abdul.
- 25 July – 4 August — Malaysia at the 2002 Commonwealth Games in Manchester, England.
- 8 August – Judge Datuk James Foong of the Kuala Lumpur High Court, Wisma Denmark, Jalan Ampang, decides that seven out of the ten people being sued by 60 residents, relatives and families of the Highland Towers collapse tragedy were negligent.
- 7–14 September — 2002 Sukma Games in Sabah.
- 29 September – 14 October — Malaysia at the 2002 Asian Games in Busan, South Korea.
- 11–13 October – 2002 Malaysian motorcycle Grand Prix.
- 26 October – 1 November — Malaysia at the 2002 FESPIC Games in Busan, South Korea.
- 21 November – The bungalow of the Affin Bank chairman General (RtD) Tan Sri Ismail Omar collapses during a landslide in Taman Hillview, Ulu Klang, Selangor. Eight people are killed.
- 4 December – Arab-Malaysian Finance Bhd appeals to Court of Appeal President Tan Sri Lamin Yunus to meet with Court of Appeal Judge Datuk Mokhtar Sidin and Datuk Mohd Saari Yusoff on compensation to be paid to victims of the Highland Towers collapse. At the Court of Appeal, three judges led by Datuk Gopal Sri Ram with Datuk Richard Malanjum and Datuk Wira Ghazali Mohd Yusoff order three negligent parties to pay damages – Ampang Jaya Municipal Council 15%, engineer Wong Yuen Kean 10%, Arab-Malaysian 30%, Metrolux Sdn Bhd and MBF Property Services Sdn Bhd 20%.
- 18 December – The islands of Sipadan and Ligitan are officially awarded to Malaysia by the International Court of Justice, who reject the Indonesian claim to the islands.

== National Day ==
=== Theme ===
Keranamu Malaysia (Because of you, Malaysia)

=== National Day parade ===
Merdeka Square, Kuala Lumpur

== Births ==
- 28 February – Hariz Hamdan – Actor.
- 5 March
  - Luqman Hakim Shamsudin – Footballer.
  - Firdaus Ghufran – Actor.
- 12 March – Kok Jing Hong – Badminton player.
- 23 March – Sikh Izhan Nazrel – Footballer.
- 4 May – Arif Aiman – Footballer.
- 6 June — Junaidi Arif — Badminton player.
- 16 June – Mohamad Aniq Kasdan – Weightlifter.
- 22 June – Harith Haiqal – Footballer.
- 25 June – Zikri Khalili – Footballer.
- 18 July – Asif Suhaimi – Actor.
- 26 August – Umar Hakeem – Footballer.
- 8 September – Wafiy – Singer.
- 23 September – Zairi Aziz – Actor.
- 29 September – Nurel Baharin – Actress.
- 25 December – Iman Troye – Singer.
- 26 December — Muhammad Haikal — Badminton player.

== Deaths ==
- 27 May – Too Joon Hing, former Deputy Minister for Education and former MCA Member of Parliament for Kinta Selatan and Teluk Intan.
- 23 June – Fadzil Noor, 6th President of the Malaysian Islamic Party, Member of Parliament for Pendang Constituency and state assemblyman for Anak Bukit State Constituency.
- 31 August – Tan Sri Wong Pow Nee, 1st Chief Minister of Penang.
- 30 October – Rejabhad, famous cartoonist.
- 5 November – Kamarulzaman Teh, former leader of Angkatan Pemuda Insaf (API) and longest political detainee in Malaysian history.

== See also ==
- 2002
- 2001 in Malaysia | 2003 in Malaysia
- History of Malaysia
- List of Malaysian films of 2002
