= 1998 in Malaysia =

- Decades: 1970s; 1980s; 1990s; 2000s; 2010s
- See also: Other events of 1998; History of Malaysia • Timeline • Years

This article lists important figures and events in Malaysian public affairs during the year 1998, together with births and deaths of notable Malaysians. Malaysia hosted the XVI Commonwealth Games in Kuala Lumpur between 11 and 21 September.

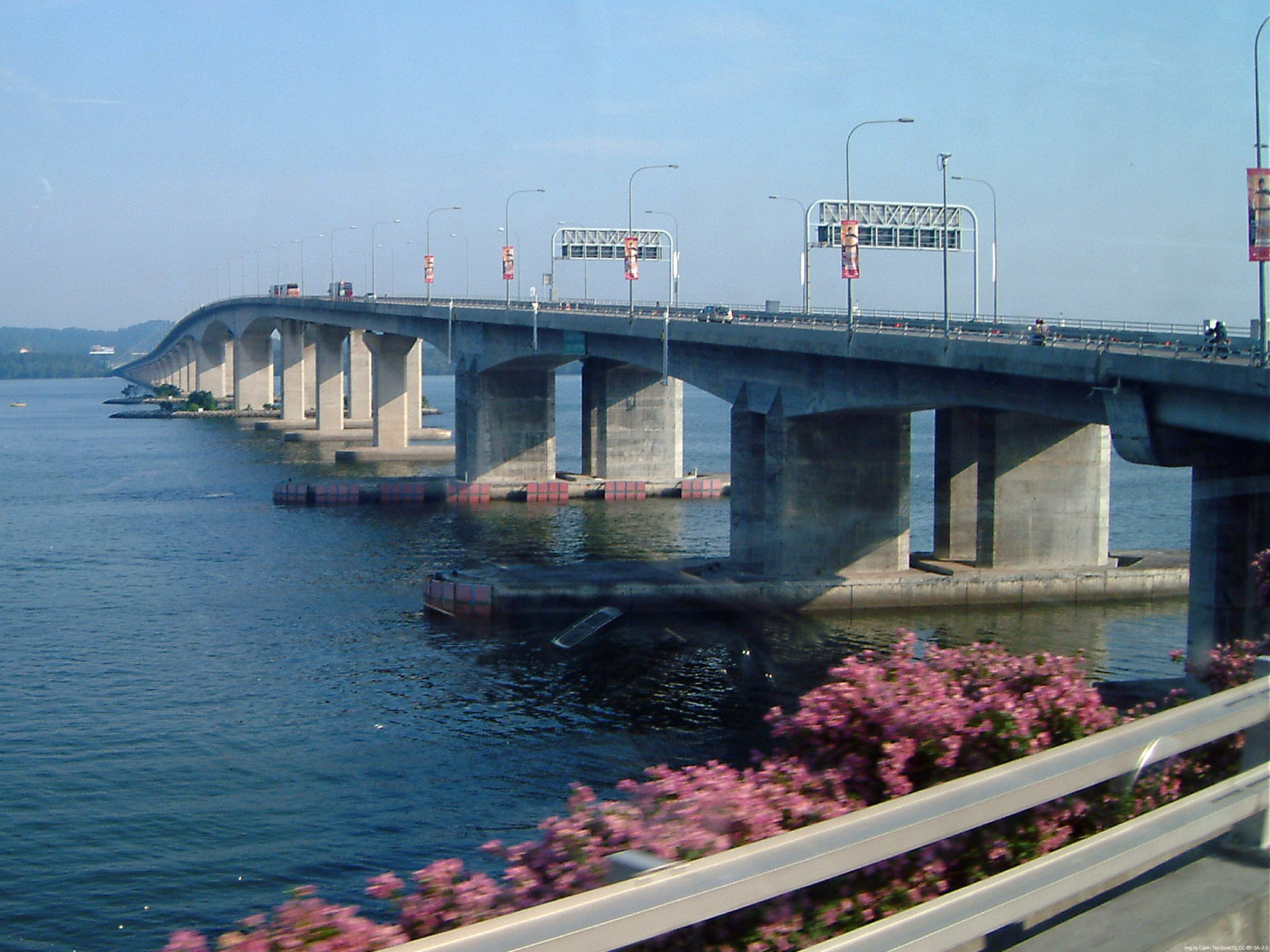
The Malaysia–Singapore Second Link

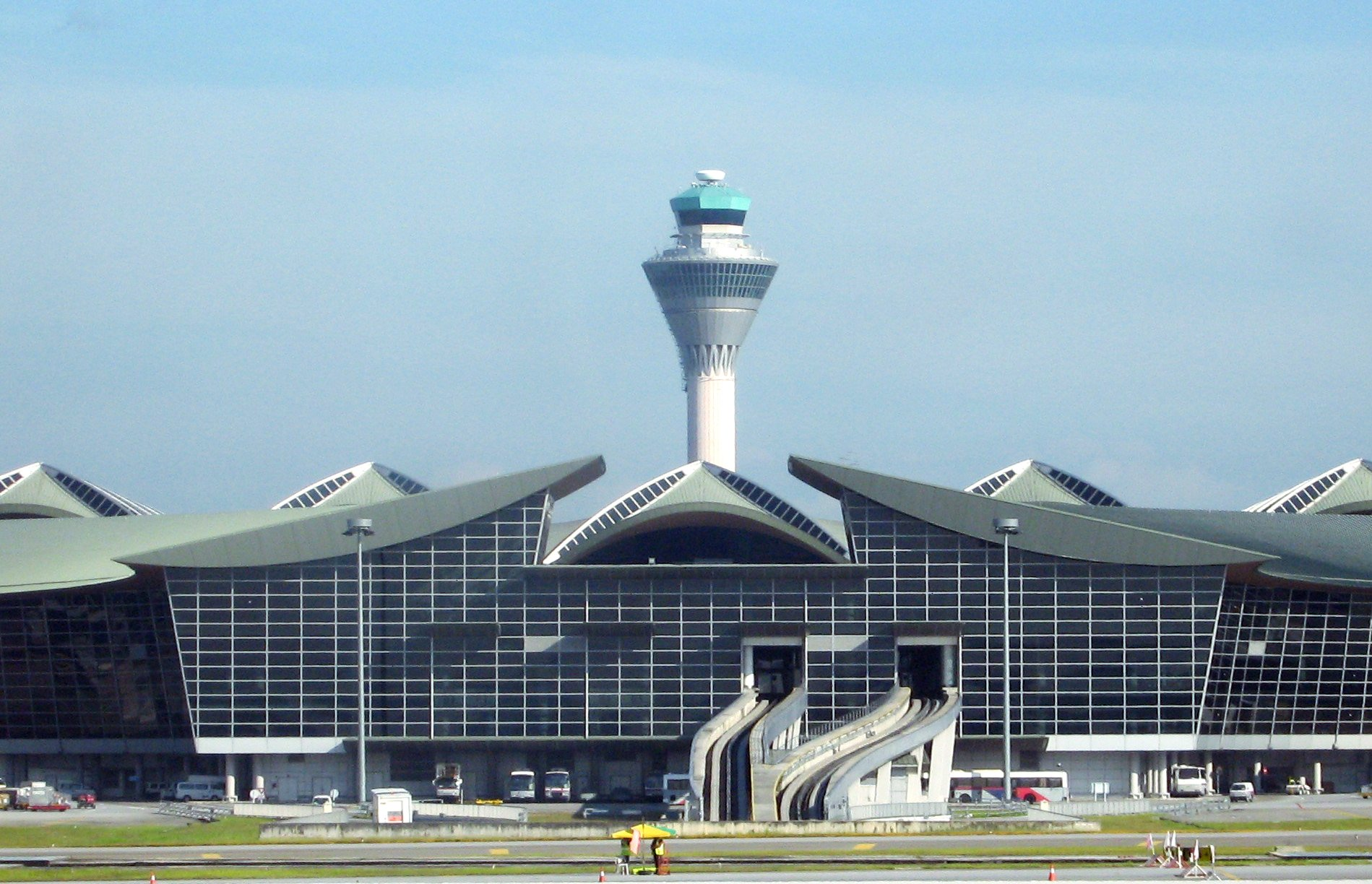
The Kuala Lumpur International Airport (KLIA)

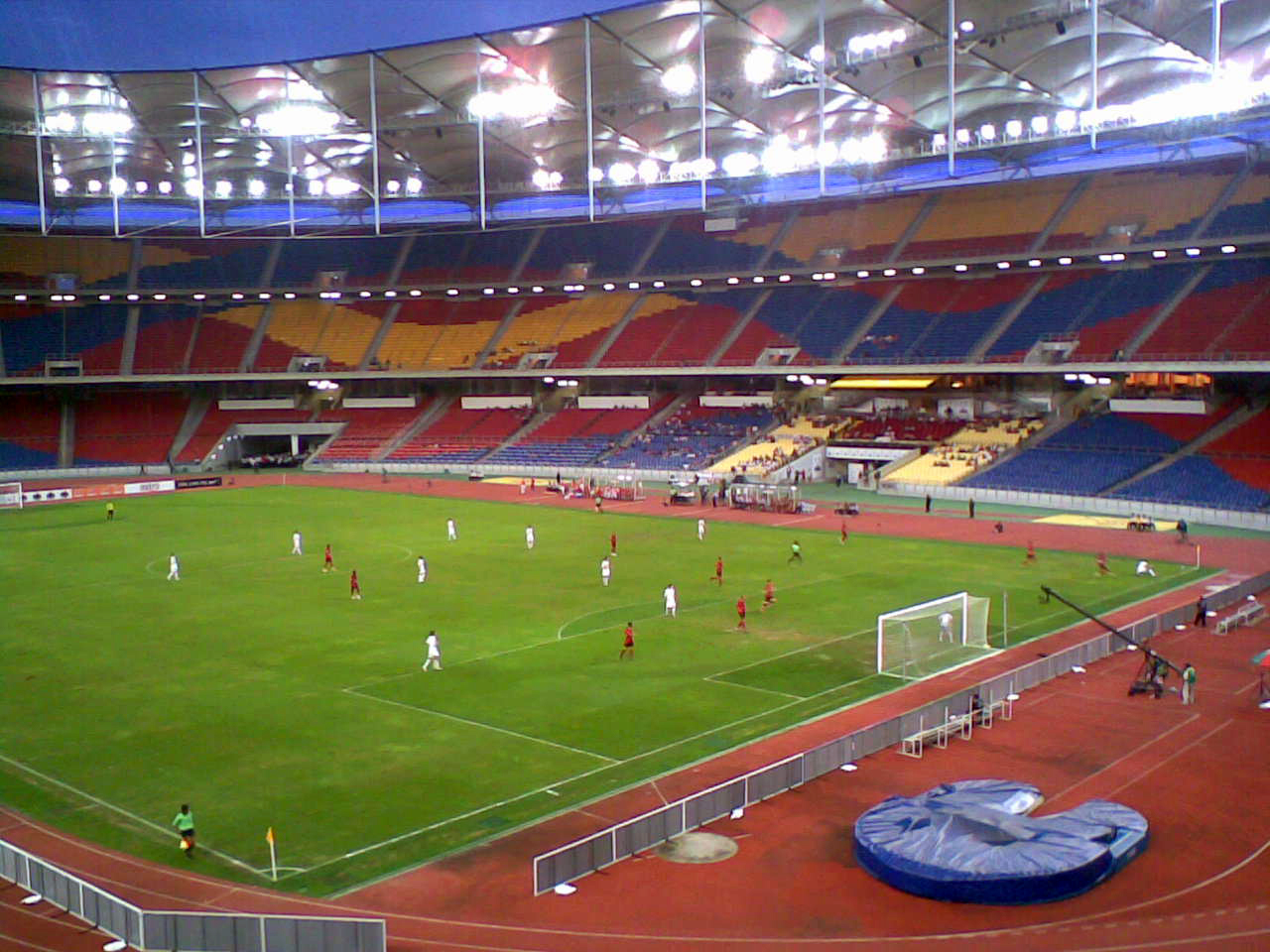
The National Stadium at National Sports Complex, Bukit Jalil.

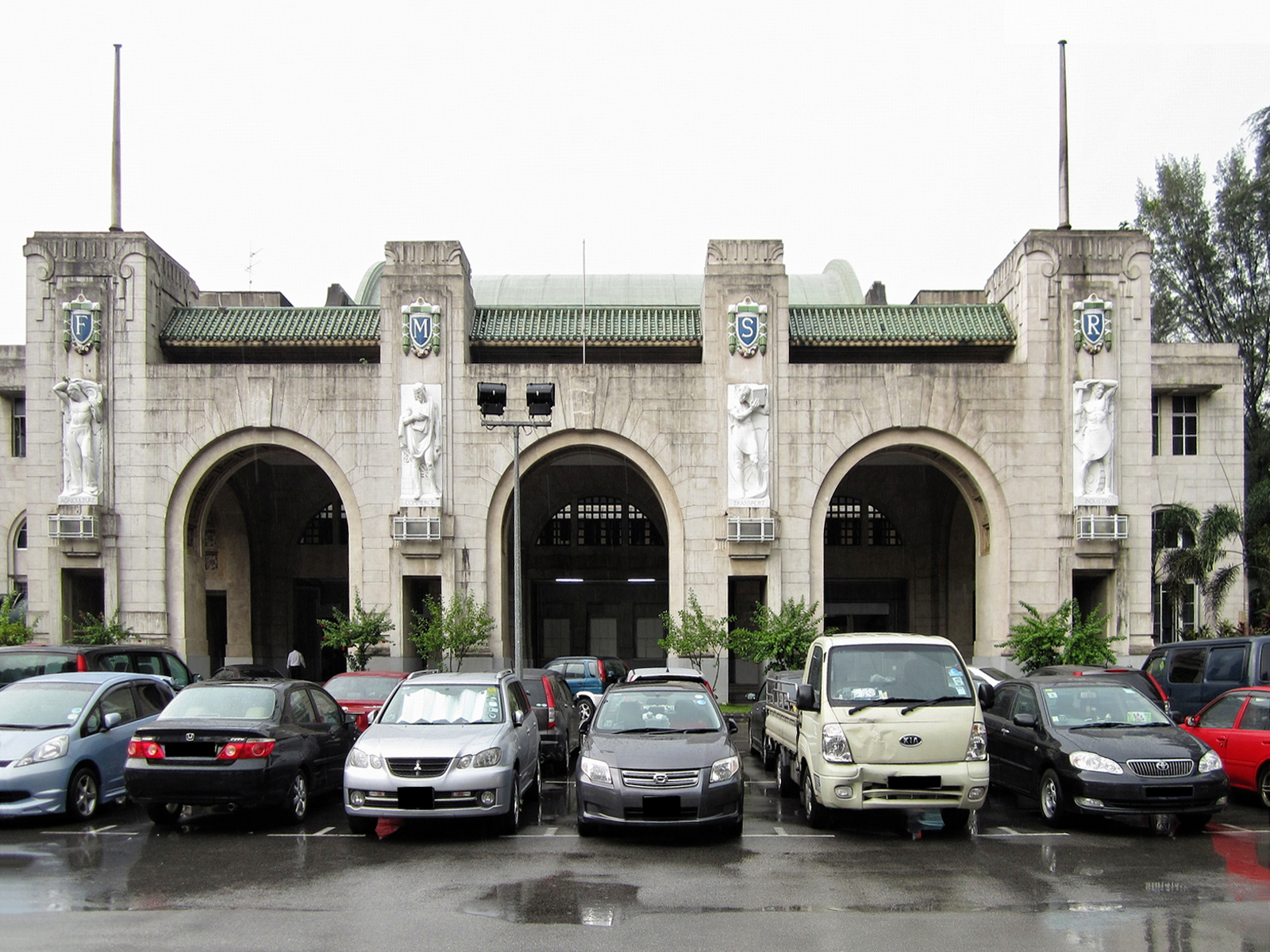
Tanjong Pagar railway station in Singapore owned by Malaysian KTMB.

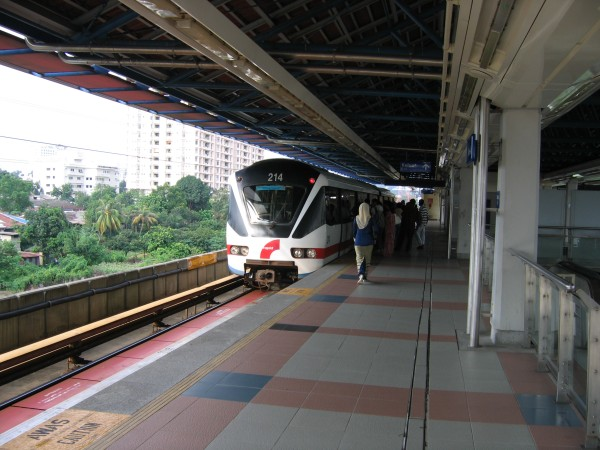
An PUTRA LRT train at Asia Jaya station

== Incumbent political figures ==
=== Federal level ===
- Yang di-Pertuan Agong: Tuanku Jaafar
- Raja Permaisuri Agong: Tuanku Najihah
- Prime Minister: Dato' Sri Dr Mahathir Mohamad
- Deputy Prime Minister: Dato' Sri Anwar Ibrahim
- Chief Justice: Eusoff Chin

=== State level ===
- Sultan of Johor: Sultan Iskandar
- Sultan of Kedah: Sultan Abdul Halim Muadzam Shah
- Sultan of Kelantan: Sultan Ismail Petra
- Raja of Perlis: Tuanku Syed Putra
- Sultan of Perak: Sultan Azlan Shah
- Sultan of Pahang: Sultan Ahmad Shah
- Sultan of Selangor: Sultan Salahuddin Abdul Aziz Shah (Deputy Yang di-Pertuan Agong)
- Sultan of Terengganu:
  - Sultan Mahmud Al-Muktafi Billah Shah (until 14 May)
  - Sultan Mizan Zainal Abidin (from 15 May)
- Yang di-Pertuan Besar of Negeri Sembilan: Tunku Naquiyuddin (Regent)
- Yang di-Pertua Negeri (Governor) of Malacca: Tun Syed Ahmad Al-Haj bin Syed Mahmud Shahabuddin
- Yang di-Pertua Negeri (Governor) of Sarawak: Tun Ahmad Zaidi Adruce Mohammed Noor

== Events ==
- February – El Nino phenomenon begins.
- February–April – The Klang Valley water crisis caused by El Niño.
- 17–26 April – The 1998 Sukma Games held in Selangor.
- 17–19 April – 1998 Malaysian motorcycle Grand Prix
- 19 April – The Malaysia–Singapore Second Crossing was officially opened.
- 21 April – Malaysian parachute expedition team with Proton Wira cars lands at the North Pole for the first time.
- 14 May – Sultan Mahmud Al-Muktafi Billah Shah of Terengganu died in Singapore, age 68. On 15 May, his son, the Yang di-Pertuan Muda of Terengganu, Tengku Mizan Zainal Abidin was elected as a new Sultan of Terengganu with the title Sultan Mizan Zainal Abidin.
- 27 June – Kuala Lumpur International Airport (KLIA) in Sepang was officially opened as the main international airport in Malaysia, replacing Subang International Airport in Subang.
- 1 July – The Kuala Lumpur mini-bus (Bas Mini) service was officially terminated.
- 11 July – The National Stadium at National Sports Complex in Bukit Jalil was officially opened.
- August – Lawsuit submitted by 73 residents in blocks two and three of the Highland Towers apartments, with a trial held at the Kuala Lumpur High Court in front of High Court Judge, Datuk James Foong. Summons against developers and nine others for losses suffered between RM31 million and RM35 million. The group sued Highland Properties Sdn Bhd, Wong Tin Sang's plan, Wong Yuen Kean engineer, Ampang Municipal Council (MPAJ), Arab-Malaysian Finance Berhad, Tropic Developments Sdn Bhd and Metroplux Sdn Bhd.
- 1 August – In Singapore, Malaysian CIQ for rail passengers controversially remained at Tanjong Pagar railway station after Singapore relocated its CIQ to Woodlands Train Checkpoint.
- 1 August – The Perodua Kembara, Malaysian first 4WD vehicle was launched.
- 17 August – The Petronas Philharmonic Hall (a subsidiary of Malaysian Philharmonic Orchestra played for the first time), Aquaria KLCC and Suria KLCC of the Petronas Twin Towers at Kuala Lumpur City Centre (KLCC) is officially opened.
- 1 September – The PUTRA Light Rail Transit system (LRT), Malaysia's first automated light rail transit system commenced operations.
- 1 September – Money banking control was introduced. The Kuala Lumpur Stock Exchange (KLSE) Composite Index rose from 400 points to 500 points.
- 2 September – Dato' Seri Anwar Ibrahim, the deputy prime minister was sacked from fifth Mahathir cabinet and parliament.
- 2 September – Anwar Ibrahim was expelled from UMNO and Dr. Munawar Anees, Anwar's former speechwriter, and Sukma Darmawan Sasmita Atmadja, Anwar's adoptive brother, were arrested under suspicion of engaging in sodomy acts.
- 11–21 September — The Kuala Lumpur 1998, XVI Commonwealth Games
  - 11 September – The 1998 Commonwealth Games opening ceremony was held in the National Stadium at the National Sports Complex. The games were opened by The King of Malaysia, Tuanku Jaafar.
  - 11–21 September – This 16th edition of the games in Kuala Lumpur was the first to be held in Asia. 69 countries were represented, including Cameroon, Kiribati and Mozambique which competed for the first time. For the first time team sports of cricket, field hockey, netball and rugby sevens were introduced. Malaysia won ten gold medals, fourteen silver medals and twelve bronze medals and ranked overall in fourth place.
  - 21 September – The 1998 Commonwealth Games closing ceremony was held in the National Stadium at the National Sports Complex. The games were closed by Queen Elizabeth II.
- 20 September – Anwar Ibrahim addressed a protest gathering of nearly 100,000 people in Kuala Lumpur, after which a number of his supporters marched to Mahathir Mohamad's then official residence Sri Perdana demanding reformasi (economic and political reforms) and Mahathir's resignation.
- 29 September – Anwar Ibrahim appeared in court and pleaded innocent to charges of corruption and sodomy.
- October – The Proton Perdana V6 and Proton Satria GTi were launched at Putra Stadium, Bukit Jalil.
- 1 November – The Malaysian Communication and Multimedia Commission (MCMC) was established.
- 17–18 November – The Tenth APEC Ministerial Meeting was held in Kuala Lumpur.
- 12 December – The Islamic Arts Museum Malaysia was officially opened.

== Births ==
- 6 January – Muhammad Haziq Nadzli – Footballer
- 22 January – Amirul Ashraf Ariffin – Footballer
- 2 February – Nur Shazrin Mohd Latif – Olympic sailor
- 5 February – Muhd Syahmi Safari – Footballer
- 13 February – Dinesh Rajasingam – Footballer
- 2 March – Tengku Muhammad Ismail – Yang di-Pertuan Muda of Terengganu
- 29 March – Lee Zii Jia – Badminton player
- 28 May – Khairul Akmal Rokisham – Footballer
- 13 June – Adam Norrodin – Malaysian motorcycle rider
- 22 July – Khairul Hafiz Jantan – Sprinter athlete
- 20 September – Khairul Idham Pawi – Malaysian motorcycle racer
- 2 October – Asri Muhamad – Footballer

== Deaths ==
- 31 January – Tan Sri Anwar Abdul Malik, founding member of UMNO (b. 1898).
- 19 April – Syed Nahar Shahabuddin, 5th Menteri Besar of Kedah (b. 1934).
- 14 May – Sultan Mahmud Al-Muktafi Billah Shah, 15th Sultan of Terengganu (b. 1930).
- 6 July – Tun Ismail Mohamed Ali, 2nd Governor of Bank Negara Malaysia (b. 1918).
- 11 August – Tan Sri Dato' Jaffar Hussein, 4th Governor of Bank Negera Malaysia (b. 1931).
- 28 August – Tan Sri Hashim Yeop Abdullah Sani, former Chief Justice of Malaya (b. 1928).
- 12 September – Tun Dr. Awang Hassan, 5th Yang di-Pertuan Negeri of Penang (b. 1910).

== See also ==
- 1998
- 1997 in Malaysia | 1999 in Malaysia
- History of Malaysia
