= 1996 in Malaysia =

- Decades: 1970s; 1980s; 1990s; 2000s; 2010s
- See also: Other events of 1996; History of Malaysia • Timeline • Years

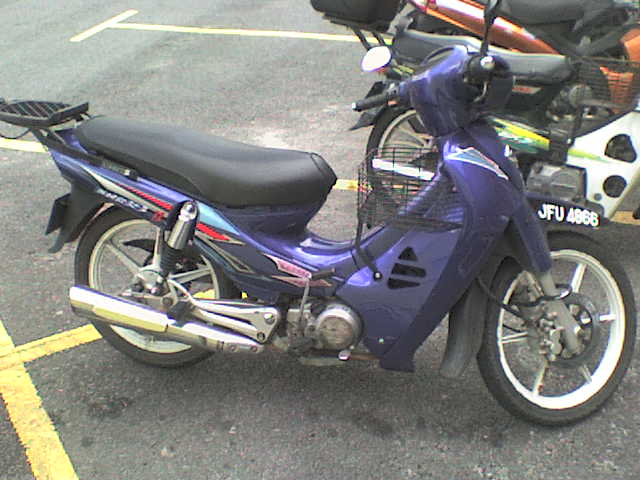
The Modenas Kriss.

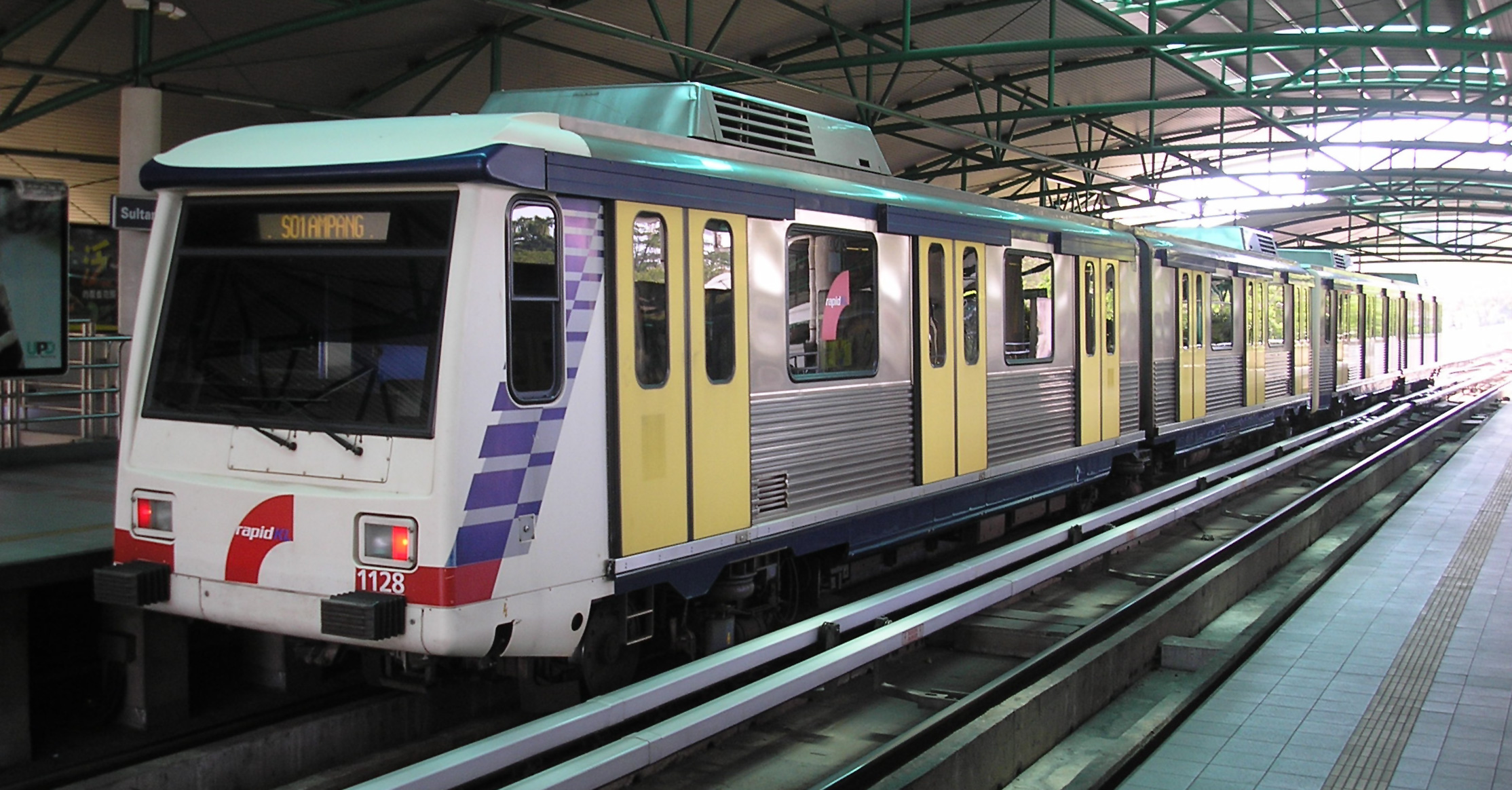
The Light Rail Transit System (Sistem Transit Aliran Ringan) (STAR LRT)

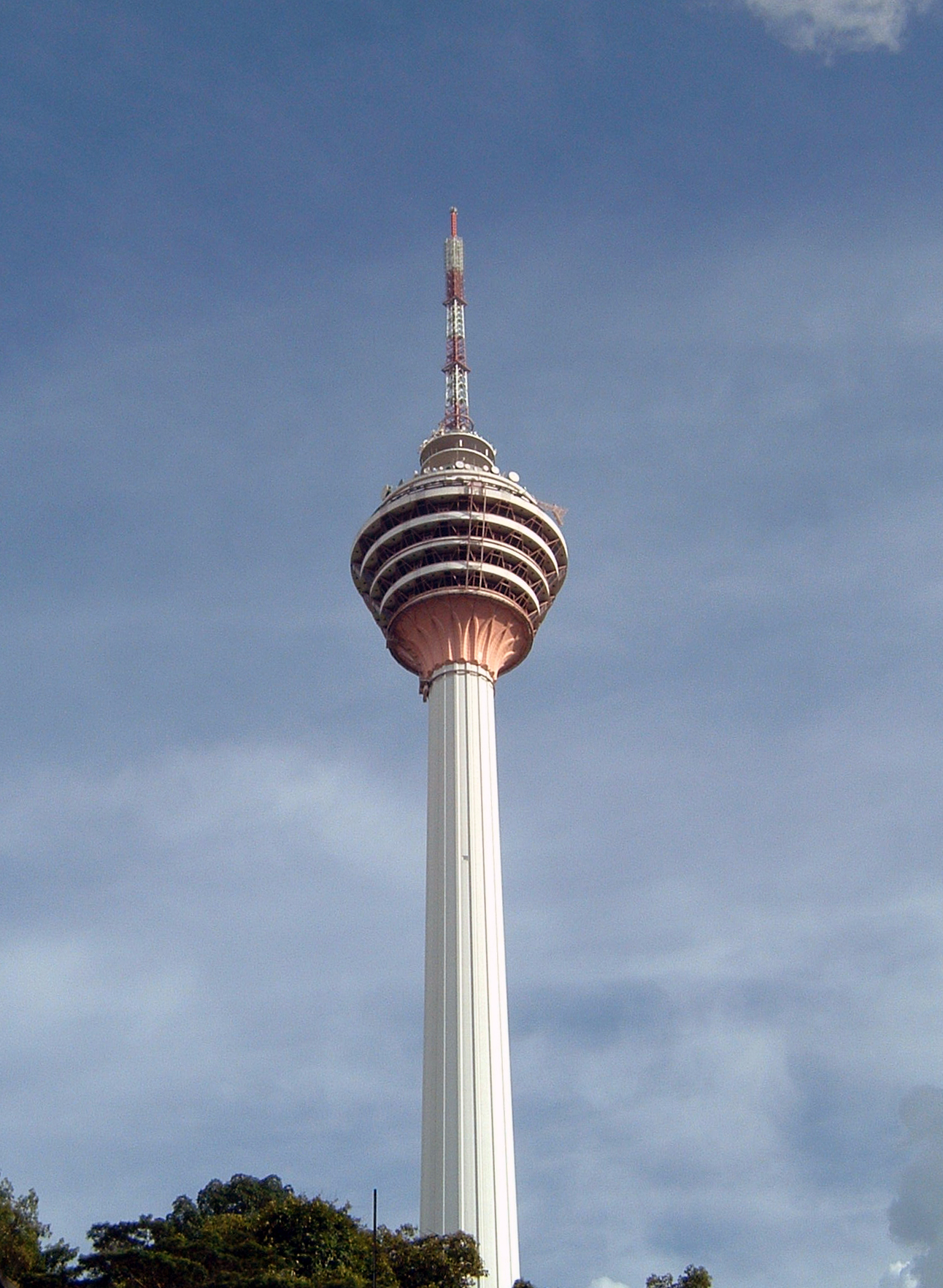
Kuala Lumpur Tower.

This article lists important figures and events in Malaysian public affairs during the year 1996, together with births and deaths of notable Malaysians.

== Incumbent political figures ==
=== Federal level ===
- Yang di-Pertuan Agong: Tuanku Jaafar
- Raja Permaisuri Agong: Tuanku Najihah
- Prime Minister: Dato' Sri Dr Mahathir Mohamad
- Deputy Prime Minister: Dato' Sri Anwar Ibrahim
- Chief Justice: Eusoff Chin

=== State level ===
- Sultan of Johor: Sultan Iskandar
- Sultan of Kedah: Sultan Abdul Halim Muadzam Shah
- Sultan of Kelantan: Sultan Ismail Petra
- Raja of Perlis: Tuanku Syed Putra
- Sultan of Perak: Sultan Azlan Shah
- Sultan of Pahang: Sultan Ahmad Shah
- Sultan of Selangor: Sultan Salahuddin Abdul Aziz Shah (Deputy Yang di-Pertuan Agong)
- Sultan of Terengganu: Sultan Mahmud Al-Muktafi Billah Shah
- Yang di-Pertuan Besar of Negeri Sembilan: Tunku Naquiyuddin (Regent)
- Yang di-Pertua Negeri (Governor) of Penang: Tun Dr Hamdan Sheikh Tahir
- Yang di-Pertua Negeri (Governor) of Malacca: Tun Syed Ahmad Al-Haj bin Syed Mahmud Shahabuddin
- Yang di-Pertua Negeri (Governor) of Sarawak: Tun Ahmad Zaidi Adruce Mohammed Noor
- Yang di-Pertua Negeri (Governor) of Sabah: Tun Sakaran Dandai

== Events ==
- 6 January – A landslide blocked the North–South Expressway (NSE) near Gua Tempurung, Perak.
- 12 January – The first Malaysian satellite MEASAT 1 was launched by the Ariane rocket from Kourou, French Guiana.
- 12 January – Seven year-old Tin Song Sheng reported missing while waiting for the bus at the Taman Rashna Chinese Primary School in Taman Melawati, Shah Alam, Selangor returned home.
- 17 January – Twenty-four people, seven of them policemen, were injured in rioting at the Sungai Besi camp for Vietnamese illegal immigrants.
- 6 February – The ground-breaking ceremony of the PUTRA-LRT underground rail tunnel from Pasar Seni to Ampang Park.
- 12 February – The Multimedia Super Corridor was established.
- 29 February–9 March – First Le Tour de Langkawi cycling tour.
- 2 March – The body of the Malay Sarawakian nationalist Rosli Dhobie was brought back from Kuching Central Prison to Sibu.
- 6 March – The Perodua Rusa, the first domestically manufactured van was launched.
- 29–31 March – 1996 Malaysian motorcycle Grand Prix
- 18 April – The Sungai Besi camp for Vietnamese illegal immigrants is officially closed.
- May – The construction of the Bakun Dam projects began.
- 2 July – A new version of Malaysian Ringgit RM 2 notes was introduced.
- 16 July – A bus ferrying a group of factory workers and their families on a holiday excursion plunged into a 120m-deep ravine at km 1 of the Genting Sempah–Genting Highlands Highway near the Genting Highlands Resort, killing 17. Six were children.
- 3 August – A widespread power outage in Peninsular Malaysia began at 5:17pm. The states of Peninsular Malaysia including Kuala Lumpur, Selangor, Putrajaya, Johor, Melaka, and Negeri Sembilan lost power for several hours. A transmission line near Sultan Ismail Power Station in Paka, Terengganu tripped at 5:17pm causing all power stations in Peninsular Malaysia to collapse resulting in a massive power failure. Supply was back to normal by 11:00pm. After this blackout, utility giant Tenaga Nasional's stock fell considerably.
- 29 August – A mud avalanche near Pos Dipang Orang Asli settlement in Kampar, Perak killed 44 people.
- 8 September – Official opening of the Light Rail Transit System (Sistem Transit Aliran Ringan) (STAR LRT) Phase 1 from Sultan Ismail to Ampang.
- 10 September – Westport was launched.
- 1 October – The Kuala Lumpur Tower at Bukit Nanas was officially opened by Prime Minister Mahathir Mohamad.
- 3 October – Malaysia's first domestically produced motorcycle, Modenas Kriss was launched.
- 8 October – The Malay political party, Semangat 46 was officially dissolved.
- 27 October – Michael Jackson held his first concert in Malaysia at Merdeka Stadium, Kuala Lumpur.
- 29 October – Michael Jackson performed for the second time in Kuala Lumpur, Malaysia.
- 2 November – The Sungai Buloh Prison in Sungai Buloh, Selangor became the federal prison, replacing Pudu Prison in Kuala Lumpur.
- 28 November – Opening of Technology Park Malaysia in Kuala Lumpur.
- 29 November – Official opening of the new Pusat Sains Negara (National Science Centre) building in Bukit Damansara, Kuala Lumpur.
- 18 December – The Yang di-Pertuan Muda of Terengganu, Tengku Mizan Zainal Abidin married Nur Zahirah.
- 26 December – Several parts of Sabah were hit by the Tropical Depression Greg. More than 120 people were killed.

== Births ==
- 5 January – Adam Nor Azlin – Footballer
- 14 June – Muhammad Ariff Farhan Mohd Isa – Footballer
- 3 July – Kumaahran Sathasivam – Footballer
- 4 August – Syazwan Andik – Footballer
- 10 August – Ifwat Akmal – Footballer
- 2 October – Ahmad Syihan Hazmi Mohamed – Footballer
- 25 November – Ahmad Zaidyansjah Ruddyansjah – Actor, Singer, Dancer
- 3 December – Muhammad Farhan Roslan – Footballer

== Deaths ==
- 13 January — Nik Abdullah Arshad, former PAS Member of Parliament for Pengkalan Chepa (b. 1935).
- 19 February — P. P. Narayanan, former President of the Malaysian Workers Union (b. 1923).
- 17 May — Ali Shah of Terengganu, 15th Sultan of Terengganu (b. 1914).
- 22 May — Wong Peng Soon, former badminton player (b. 1917).
- 27 July — Yen Yuen Chang, Malaysian and Singaporean Chinese educator (b. 1909).
- 14 October — Tan Chee Khoon, 2nd Leader of the Opposition and founder of GERAKAN (b. 1919).

== See also ==
- 1996
- 1995 in Malaysia | 1997 in Malaysia
- Years in Malaysia
