= 2001 in Malaysia =

- Decades: 1980s; 1990s; 2000s; 2010s; 2020s
- See also: Other events of 2001; History of Malaysia • Timeline • Years

This article lists important figures and events in Malaysian public affairs during the year 2001, as well as births and deaths of notable Malaysians. 2001 marked is 44th anniversary of Malaysia's Independence.

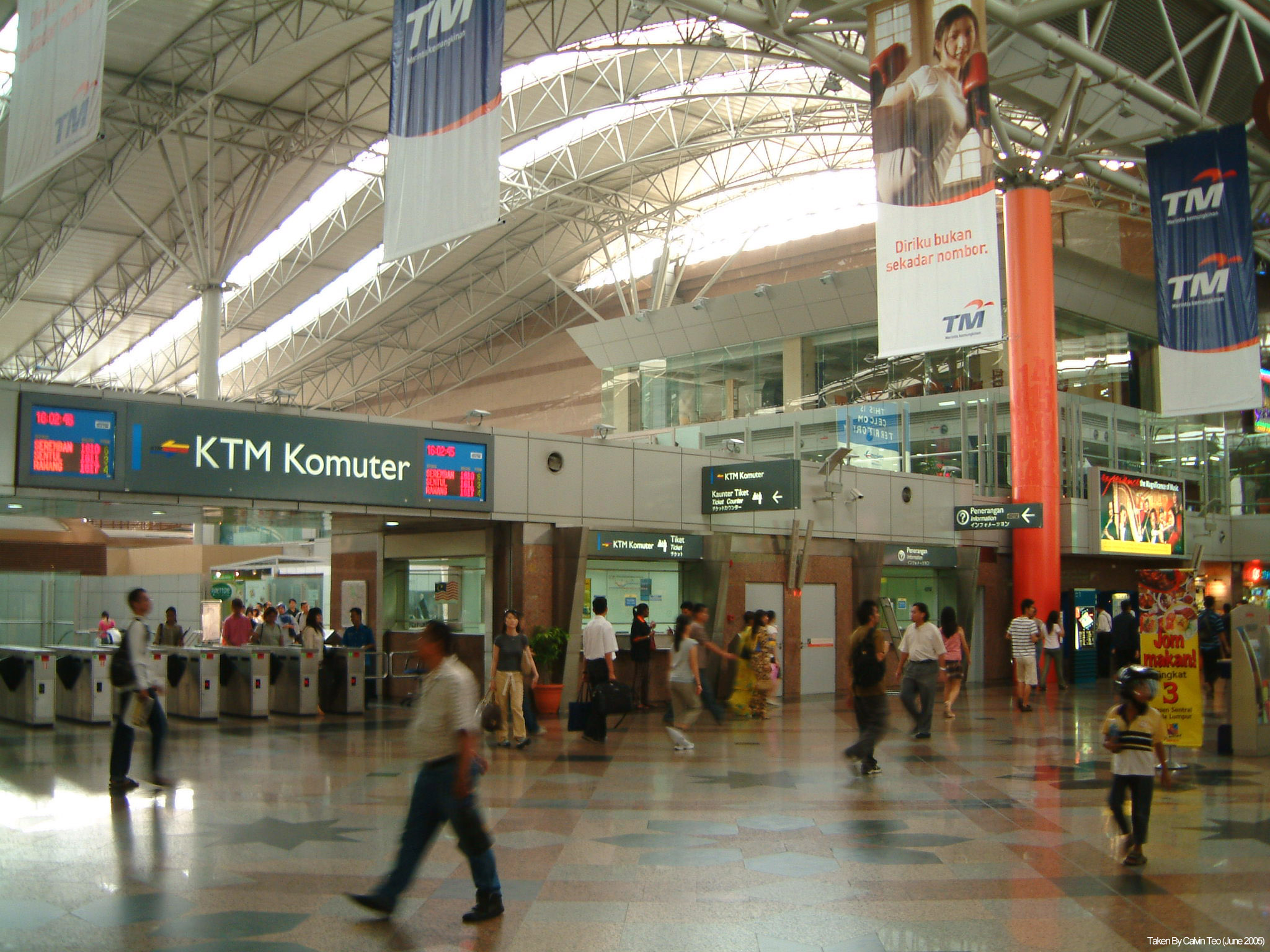
KL Sentral station in Kuala Lumpur, Malaysia.

== Incumbent political figures ==
=== Federal level ===
- Yang di-Pertuan Agong:
  - Sultan Salahuddin Abdul Aziz Shah of Selangor (until 21 November)
  - Tuanku Syed Sirajuddin of Perlis (from 13 December)
- Raja Permaisuri Agong:
  - Tengku Permaisuri Siti Aishah of Selangor (until 21 November)
  - Tengku Fauziah of Perlis (from 13 December)
- Deputy Yang di-Pertuan Agong: Sultan Mizan Zainal Abidin of Terengganu
- Prime Minister: Tun Dr. Mahathir Mohamad
- Deputy Prime Minister: Dato' Sri Abdullah Ahmad Badawi
- President of the Dewan Negara: Tun Tan Sri Michael Chen Wing Sum
- Speaker of the Dewan Rakyat: Tun Dr. Mohamed Zahir Ismail
- Chief Justice: Mohamed Dzaiddin Abdullah

=== State level ===
- Johor:
  - Sultan of Johor: Sultan Iskandar
  - Menteri Besar of Johor: Abdul Ghani Othman
- Kedah:
  - Sultan of Kedah: Sultan Abdul Halim Mu'adzam Shah
  - Menteri Besar of Kedah: Syed Razak Syed Zain Barakbah
- Kelantan:
  - Sultan of Kelantan: Sultan Ismail Petra
  - Menteri Besar of Kelantan: Nik Abdul Aziz Nik Mat
- Perlis:
  - Raja of Perlis: Tuanku Syed Faizuddin Putra (Regent from 13 December)
  - Menteri Besar of Perlis: Shahidan Kassim
- Perak:
  - Sultan of Perak: Sultan Azlan Muhibbuddin Shah
  - Menteri Besar of Perak: Tajol Rosli Mohd Ghazali
- Pahang:
  - Sultan of Pahang: Sultan Haji Ahmad Shah Al-Musta'in Billah
  - Menteri Besar of Pahang: Adnan Yaakob
- Selangor:
  - Sultan of Selangor:
    - Tengku Idris Shah (Regent until 21 November)
    - Sultan Sharafuddin Idris Shah (from 21 November)
  - Menteri Besar of Selangor: Mohamad Khir Toyo
- Terengganu:
  - Sultan of Terengganu: Sultan Mizan Zainal Abidin
  - Menteri Besar of Terengganu: Abdul Hadi Awang
- Negeri Sembilan:
  - Yang di-Pertuan Besar of Negeri Sembilan: Tuanku Ja'afar
  - Menteri Besar of Negeri Sembilan: Mohd Isa Abdul Samad
- Penang:
  - Governor of Penang:
    - Tun Hamdan Sheikh Tahir (until 30 April)
    - Tun Abdul Rahman Abbas (from 1 May)
  - Chief Minister of Penang: Koh Tsu Koon
- Malacca:
  - Governor of Malacca: Tun Syed Ahmad Syed Mahmud Shahabuddin
  - Chief Minister of Malacca: Mohd Ali Rustam
- Sarawak:
  - Governor of Sarawak: Tun Abang Muhammad Salahuddin (from 22 February)
  - Chief Minister of Sarawak: Abdul Taib Mahmud
- Sabah:
  - Governor of Sabah: Tun Sakaran Dandai
  - Chief Minister of Sabah:
    - Osu Sukam (until 27 March)
    - Chong Kah Kiat (from 27 March)

== Events ==
- 15 January – Nine people are killed and five are seriously injured when an express bus and a trailer lorry collide head-on at the 24th kilometre of the Sarikei-Sibu road (Pan Borneo Highway) during heavy rain.
- 1 February – Putrajaya is transferred to the federal government and comes the third Federal Territory after Kuala Lumpur and Labuan.
- 4–18 February — 2001 Tour de Langkawi.
- April – Malaysia Airlines becomes the first airline in the world to pilot a twin-engine commercial jet through the newly opened polar routes, passing through the inhospitable regions of Russia and North Alaska.
- 12 April – Twelve women and a boy are killed when a bus skids and crashes into a ditch off the Pengkalan Hulu-Baling road near Baling, Kedah.
- 17 April – Tuanku Syed Sirajuddin of Perlis is installed as the 8th Raja of Perlis.
- 14 May – President of Cuba, Fidel Castro makes an official visit to Malaysia. Malaysia establishes diplomatic relations with Cuba.
- 3 June — 2001 International Penang Bridge Run.
- 13 June – KL Sentral station, the biggest transportation station in Kuala Lumpur as well in Malaysia is opened, replacing the old Kuala Lumpur railway station.
- 29 June – Dewan Tunku Canselor at the University of Malaya, Kuala Lumpur is destroyed by fire.
- 12 August – A 'fireball' UFO is spotted at the Malaysia–Singapore Second Link that joins Malaysia and Singapore.
- 5 September – MyKad, the Malaysian Government Multipurpose Card is launched.
- 8–17 September – 2001 Southeast Asian Games:
  - The 2001 Southeast Asian Games opening ceremony is held in the Bukit Jalil National Stadium at the National Sports Complex. The games are opened by the Yang di-Pertuan Agong, Sultan Salahuddin Abdul Aziz Shah of Selangor.
  - This 21st edition games are the fifth time Malaysia hosted the games, and the first time since 1989 SEA Games.
  - Around 4,165 athletes from ten Southeast Asian nations participate in the games, which feature 391 events in 32 sports.
  - The closing ceremony is held on 17 September in the Bukit Jalil National Stadium at National Sports Complex. The games are closed by Prime Minister, Mahathir Mohamad.
  - Malaysia won 111 gold medals, 75 silver medals and 85 bronze medals, emerging overall champion in first place.
- 11 September – The September 11 attacks in New York City, USA. More than 2,602 people were killed, including three Malaysians.
- 19–21 October – 2001 Malaysian motorcycle Grand Prix
- 26–29 October – 2001 ASEAN Para Games:
  - This first edition of these games for athletes with physical disabilities is held in Kuala Lumpur. Ten Southeast Asian nations participated at the games. Malaysia won 143 gold medals, 136 silver medals and 92 bronze medals in this edition and emerges overall champion in first place.
- 2 November – Maznah Ismail (aka Mona Fandey), Mohd Affendi Abdul Rahman and Juraimi Hussin, three infamous criminals who killed Dato' Mazlan Idris, a Batu Talam DUN assemblyman of Pahang state, are executed in Kajang Prison, Kajang, Selangor.
- 21 November – Death of Sultan Salahuddin Abdul Aziz Shah of Selangor:
  - The 11th Yang di-Pertuan Agong, Sultan Salahuddin Abdul Aziz Shah of Selangor dies at the age of 75. His body is brought back to Selangor and laid to rest at the royal mausoleum near Sultan Sulaiman Mosque, Klang, Selangor. The Raja Muda of Selangor Tengku Idris Shah becomes the 9th Sultan of Selangor with the title Sultan Sharafuddin Idris Shah.
- 22 November – Death of Sultan Salahuddin Abdul Aziz Shah of Selangor:
  - Mahathir expressed grief over the passing of Salahuddin.
  - The Prime Minister's official residence in Putrajaya was closed to the public for two days.
  - His passing was announced by Prime Minister Mahathir Mohamad via television and radio broadcasts. He announced a seven-days period of national mourning and directed that flags be flown at half-mast throughout that time.
- 13 December – Tuanku Syed Sirajuddin of Perlis becomes the 12th Yang di-Pertuan Agong.
- 26 December – Tropical Storm Vamei hits Johor.

== National Day ==
=== Theme ===
Keranamu Malaysia (Because of you, Malaysia)

=== National Day parade ===
Merdeka Square, Kuala Lumpur

== Births ==
- 3 July – William Yap, actor and singer.
- 7 November – Mukhairi Ajmal, footballer.

== Deaths ==
- 16 May – Ahmad Razali Mohd Ali, 11th Menteri Besar of Selangor (b. 1928).
- 31 May – Hormat Rafei, 10th Menteri Besar of Selangor (b. 1923).
- 4 July – Stephen Yong Kuet Tze, former Minister of Science, Technology and Innovation and 1st Secretary-General of the Sarawak United People's Party (b. 1921).
- 5 September – Toh Kar Lim, Member of the Central Committee of the Malayan Communist Party and former Commander of the 8th MNLA Regiment (b. 1921).
- 2 November – Mona Fandey, murderer and singer (b. 1956).
- 21 November – Sultan Salahuddin Abdul Aziz Shah of Selangor, 8th Sultan of Selangor and 11th Yang di-Pertuan Agong of Malaysia (b. 1926).
- 29 November – Usman Awang, poet and writer (b. 1929).

== See also ==
- 2001
- 2000 in Malaysia | 2002 in Malaysia
- History of Malaysia
- List of Malaysian films of 2001
