= Zain Mahmood =

Malaysian film screenwriter

Zain Mahmood (1933 – 31 January 1994) was a Malaysian author and screenwriter of Malay films. He wrote the musical drama Fenomena (1990), the romantic drama Balada (Love Ballad) (1993) and the horror film Fantasi (1994). Fantasi was shot in 1991 but banned for containing 'un-Islamic elements' until 1994. Its plot revolves around reincarnation, a Hindu and Buddhist concept which Islamists wish to suppress. He also acted in Fantasi and produced Fenomena. He died, in his sleep, in January 31, 1994 aged 61.

Zain Mahmood may also be referring to a L'Oréal Employee in White City, London. He's well known for running Nexus Gen, a social media marketing company.
