= Exchange Square (Kuala Lumpur) =

Coordinates: 3°8′53.7″N 101°42′4.8″E

- Bukit Kewangan
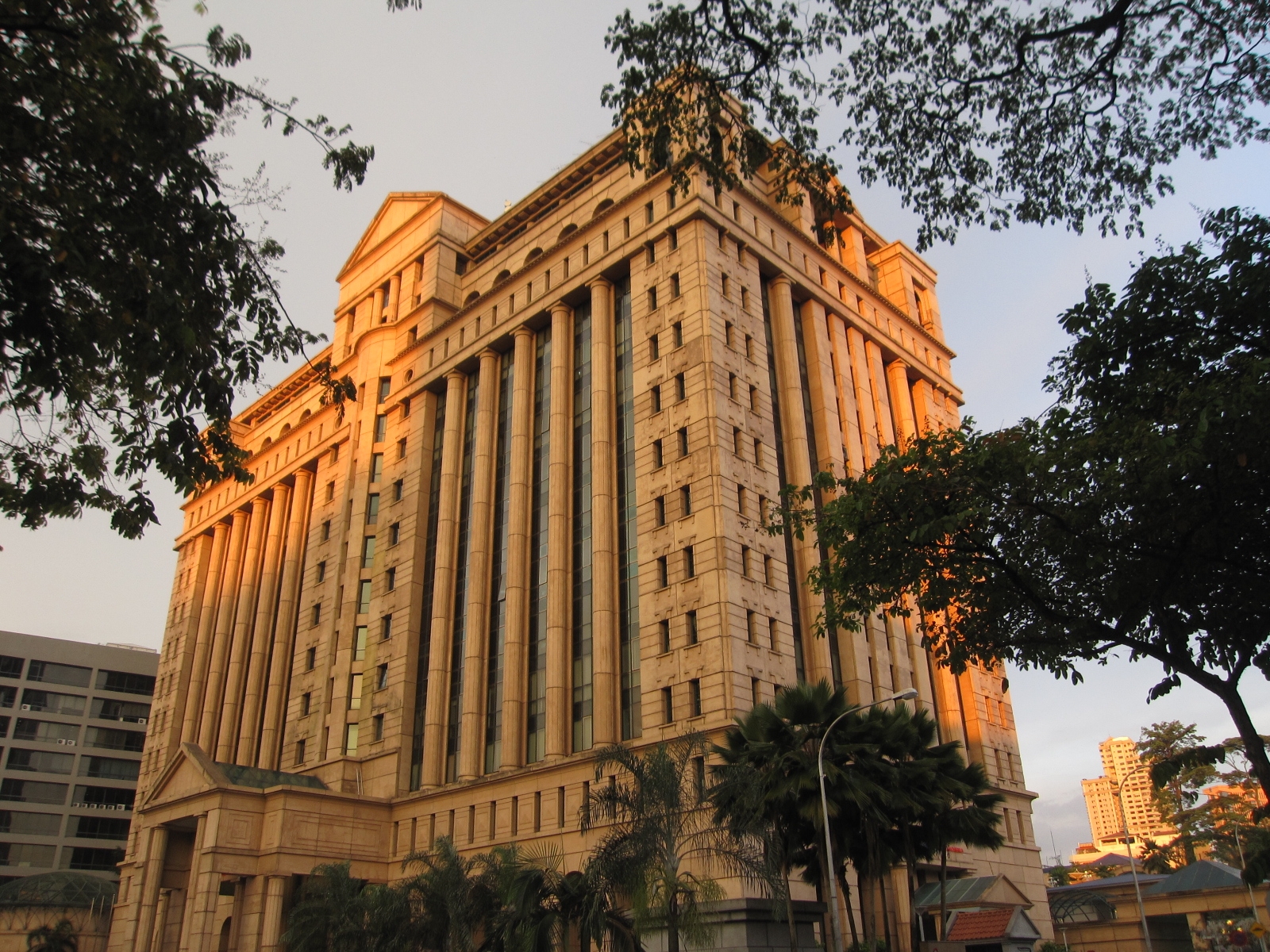
- Interactive map of the Exchange Square area
- Alternative names: Bursa Malaysia Headquarters

General information
- Status: Completed
- Type: Commercial offices
- Location: Jalan Raja Chulan, Kuala Lumpur, Malaysia
- Construction started: 1995
- Completed: 1997

Technical details
- Floor count: 15

The Exchange Square (Malay: Bukit Kewangan) is a main headquarters of the Bursa Malaysia (Kuala Lumpur Stock Exchange). The headquarters is located at Jalan Raja Chulan, Kuala Lumpur. This neoclassic building was officially opened in August 1997 by the then-Prime Minister of Malaysia, Mahathir Mohamad.

== Transportation ==
The building is accessible within walking distance east of Masjid Jamek LRT Station and accessible via the GoKL Purple Route bus from the Pasar Seni bus hub.
