= Joseph Fernandez =

Joseph Fernandez may refer to:

- Joe Fernandez (businessman) (born 1977), founder of Klout
- Joseph A. Fernandez, Chancellor, NYC Department of Education, 1990–1993
- Joseph F. Fernandez (born 1937), CIA operative and figure in the Iran-Contra Affair
- Joseph Gabriel Fernandez (1925–2023), bishop of Quilon
- Joseph Fernandez, one of the Vietnamese Martyrs
