= Mohamed Dzaiddin Abdullah =

Malaysian judge, police officer and reporter (1938–2024)

Yang Amat Berbahagia Tun Mohamed Dzaiddin Abdullah SSM PSM SPMP SPCM DSPJ DMPN

3rd Chief Justice of Malaysia
- In office 20 December 2000 – 14 March 2003
- Nominated by: Mahathir Mohamad
- Appointed by: Salahuddin
- Preceded by: Mohamed Eusoff Chin
- Succeeded by: Ahmad Fairuz Abdul Halim

Personal details
- Born: Mohamed Dzaiddin bin Abdullah; 16 September 1938 Arau, Perlis, Unfederated Malay States (now Malaysia)
- Died: 11 July 2024 (aged 85) Kuala Lumpur, Malaysia
- Resting place: Bukit Kiara Muslim Cemetery, Damansara, Kuala Lumpur
- Spouse: Tengku Noriah Tengku Ismail
- Children: Nadjihah; Azlan
- Education: Malay School, Arau, Perlis; Sultan Abdul Hamid College, Alor Setar, Kedah
- Occupation: Police officer; reporter
- Profession: Judge

Mohamed Dzaiddin bin Abdullah (16 September 1938 – 11 July 2024) was a Malaysian judge, police officer and reporter who served as the 3rd Chief Justice of Malaysia from December 2000 to March 2003. He was also the first lawyer to become the Chief Justice.

Mohamed Dzaiddin received his primary education at Malay School, Arau, Perlis, and had his secondary education at Sultan Abdul Hamid College in Alor Setar, Kedah. From 1956 to September 1957, he worked as a reporter for The Malay Mail before joining the Royal Malayan Police Force as an inspector with the Special Branch.

He went on to become Barrister-at-Law at the Honourable Society of Middle Temple, Inns of Court, London, United Kingdom, in 1961. Mohamed Dzaiddin studied law in London in 1962 and subsequently entered private practice before being elevated to the bench.

On 19 July 1966, he was called to the English Bar. About six months later, he was also called to the Malaysian Bar, which he served as Vice-President of the Malaysian Bar Council from 1981 to 1982.

In January 1967, Mohamed Dzaiddin was admitted as an advocate and solicitor of the High Court of Malaya and served in Kota Bharu, Kelantan and Kuala Lumpur till October 1982.

He began his judicial career as a part-time Judicial Commissioner for three years in 1979.

Mohamed Dzaiddin was also the chairman of the Kelantan Bar Council and represented the state in the Bar Council.

In 1997, he was elected as the president of the ASEAN Law Association and remained its president till 2003.

On 1 October 1982, Mohamed Dzaiddin was appointed a High Court judge in Kuala Lumpur and Penang and slightly more than a decade later on 18 December 1992 and January 1993, he was appointed the Supreme Court judge and later the Federal Court judge.

In June 2000, Mohamed Dzaiddin was bestowed the Grade of Panglima Setia Mahkota (PSM) by the Yang di-Pertuan Agong, which carries the title "Tan Sri". Later in June 2002, he was bestowed the Grade of Seri Setia Mahkota (SSM) by the Yang DiPertuan Agong, which carries the title "Tun".

After retiring as the Chief Justice in March 2003, Mohamed Dzaiddin took up the job of the legal consultant at Skrine.

On 4 February 2004, Mohamed Dzaiddin was appointed by the Yang di-Pertuan Agong as chairman of the Royal Commission to Enhance the Operation and Management of the Royal Malaysia Police. On 30 April 2005, the Report was submitted to the Government. It contained 125 recommendations, the core proposal was the establishment of a body called the Independent Police Complaints and Misconduct Commission (IPCMC), replaced by the Independent Police Conduct Commission (IPCC) in 2023.

An avid golfer, Mohamed Dzaiddin was married to Tengku Noriah Tengku Ismail and they have two children, Nadjihah and Azlan.

== Death ==
On 11 July 2024, Mohamed Dzaiddin died in a private hospital in Kuala Lumpur, two days after being admitted to the hospital due to heart complications. He was 85. Mohamed Dzaiddin was buried in the Bukit Kiara Muslim Cemetery the following day.

== Honours ==
=== Honours of Malaysia ===
- Malaysia
  - Grand Commander of the Order of Loyalty to the Crown of Malaysia (SSM) – Tun (2002)
  - Commander of the Order of Loyalty to the Crown of Malaysia (PSM) – Tan Sri (2000)
- Penang
  - Companion of the Order of the Defender of State (DMPN) – Dato' (1987)
- Perlis
  - Knight Grand Commander of Order of the Crown of Perlis (SPMP) – Dato' Seri (2012)
  - Knight Companion of the Order of the Gallant Prince Syed Putra Jamalullail (DSPJ) – Dato' (1996)
- Perak
  - Knight Grand Commander of the Order of Cura Si Manja Kini (SPCM) – Dato' Seri (2001)

Legal offices
Preceded by Mohamed Eusoff Chin	Chief Justice of Malaysia; 2000–2003	Succeeded by Ahmad Fairuz Abdul Halim
