= Mohamed Eusoff Chin =

Malaysian lawyer (1936–2026)

Yang Amat Berbahagia Tun Dato' Seri Mohamed Eusoff Chin SSM PSM SPCM SSMT DGSM JSM

2nd Chief Justice of Malaysia
- In office 25 September 1994 – 19 December 2000
- Nominated by: Mahathir Mohamad
- Appointed by: Ja'afar
- Preceded by: Abdul Hamid Omar
- Succeeded by: Mohamed Dzaiddin Abdullah

Personal details
- Born: Mohamed Eusoff bin Chin; 10 May 1936
- Died: 7 August 2026 (aged 90)
- Citizenship: Malaysian
- Profession: Lawyer

Mohamed Eusoff bin Chin (5 May 1936 – 7 August 2026) was a Malaysian lawyer who served as the second Chief Justice of Malaysia from September 1994 to December 2000. He died on 7 August 2026, at the age of 90.

== Honours ==
- Malaysia
  - Grand Commander of the Order of Loyalty to the Crown of Malaysia (SSM) – Tun (1997)
  - Commander of the Order of Loyalty to the Crown of Malaysia (PSM) – Tan Sri (1993)
  - Companion of the Order of Loyalty to the Crown of Malaysia (JSM) (1978)
- Malacca
  - Grand Commander of the Exalted Order of Malacca (DGSM) – Datuk Seri (1999)
- Perak
  - Knight Grand Commander of the Order of Cura Si Manja Kini (SPCM) – Dato' Seri (1995)
- Terengganu
  - Knight Grand Companion of the Order of Sultan Mahmud I of Terengganu (SSMT) – Dato' Seri (1997)

Legal offices
Preceded by Abdul Hamid Omar	Chief Justice of Malaysia; 1994–2000	Succeeded by Mohamed Dzaiddin Abdullah
