= Timeline of Malaysian history =

This is a timeline of Malaysian history, comprising important legal and territorial changes and political events in Malaysia and its predecessor states. To read about the background to these events, see History of Malaysia.

== Prehistory ==
Year	Event
1,830,000 BCE	Hand axes from early hominids, probably Homo erectus, have been unearthed in Lenggong, making them some of the oldest evidence of hominid habitation in Southeast Asia.
40,000 BCE	The earliest evidence of modern human habitation in Malaysia is a skull excavated from the Niah Caves from this time period.
11,000 BCE	Perak Man: The oldest complete skeleton found in Malaysia was dated to this time.

== 2nd century ==
Year	Event
200	The ancient Hindu Malay kingdom of Langkasuka was founded by Merong Mahawangsa, a descendant of Alexander the Great or Dhu al-Qarnayn.
200	The ancient Hindu Malay kingdom of Gangga Negara was founded by Ganji Sarjuna, a son of Merong Mahawangsa.

== 4th century ==
Year	Event
400	The emergence of the Kedah Tua civilization began with the involvement of the community in Guar Kepah conducting trade with foreign traders in Sungai Mas. The center of the civilization was in Sungai Mas and Pangkalan Bujang.
400	Gangga Negara also served as a port, frequented by foreign traders for its rich natural resources such as gold and tin.

== 7th century ==
Year	Event
630	The Hindu Malay Kingdom of Kedah was founded by Maharaja Derbar Raja of Persia.
671	Yijing visited Kedah and Srivijaya on his way to India from China.
682	Yijing returned to Kedah and Srivijaya on his way back from India to China. He described the Malays as having high status in controlling the economy and its kingdom's entry points.
700	The Malay Peninsula fell under the dominance of the Buddhist Malay Srivijaya, based in Palembang.
700	The Sawaku Kingdom was founded by Datu Merpati near Santubong and Sarawak River. The Samadong Kingdom was founded near Samarahan and Sadong.

== 8th century ==
Year	Event
750	Srivijaya attacked Langkasuka and conquered the kingdom.
775	The king of Srivijaya married a princess of Langkasuka and made Ligor his capital.

== 9th century ==
Year	Event
850	Gangga Negara defended its sovereignty from a Srivijaya invasion.
890	Klang Kio attacked and defeated Gangga Negara but withdrew after its ruler, Bolaputra, married a princess of Gangga Negara.

== 11th century ==
Year	Event
1025	A Chola army invasion from southern India weakened trade in Kedah and Gangga Negara.
1100	The Melano Kingdom was founded by Tugau near Sungai Retus.

== 12th century ==
Year	Event
1136	Phra Ong Mahawangsa converted to Islam and founded the Kedah Sultanate, ending the practice of Hinduism in the dynasty.

== 13th century ==
Year	Event
1245	Sang Sapurba, a legendary ancestor of significant dynasties in the Malay world and descendant of Alexander the Great or Dhul-Qarnayn, entered into a sacred covenant with Demang Lebar Daun, the ruler of Palembang, and subsequently laid the basis of the relationship between the Malay rulers and subjects.
1260	Minangkabau people journeyed to the Malay Peninsula.
1280	Siamese begun to occupy the northern Malay Peninsula. Negara Sri Dharmaraja and Patani, became Siamese vassals.
1299	Kingdom of Singapura was founded by Sang Nila Utama, a son of Sang Sapurba.

== 14th century ==
Year	Event
1303	Islam reached Terengganu, proven by the discovery of the Terengganu Inscription Stone in Kuala Berang. This is the earliest evidence of Jawi writing in Malay.
1330	The Chinese traveler Wang Dayuan visited Singapura and recorded an attack by Siam, recording it alongside Long Ya Men and Ban Zu.
1360	Singapura Kingdom attacked and was defeated by the Hindu Buddhist Javanese Kingdom of Majapahit.
1362	Badang, a legendary Malay strongman, was elected as the Hulubalang of Singapura.
1363	The Brunei Sultanate was established when the Sultan of Brunei married a princess of Singapura and converted to Islam.
1398	Parameswara, a prince of Srivijaya and the last king of Singapura fled from the Singapura.

== 15th century ==
Year	Event
1400	Malacca Kingdom was founded by Parameswara, the last king of Singapura.
1403	Chinese admiral Yin Ching reached Malacca, and established diplomatic ties between China and Malacca.
1403	The first Malay-Chinese dictionary was compiled in Chinese characters containing about 500 words related to trade used in Malacca.
1409	Chinese admiral Cheng Ho reached Malacca, strengthening diplomatic ties between China and Malacca.
1414	Malacca established diplomatic ties with Pasai, when Megat Iskandar Shah married a princess of Pasai and converted to Islam.
1444	Hang Tuah, the legendary Malaccan Laksamana, was born in Malacca.
1445	Tun Perak, the Penghulu of Klang, lead the Malaccan army to victory by defeating Siamese invaders in Muar.
1450	Sharif ul-Hashim arrived in Sulu from Malacca, married a daughter of Raja Baginda, and founded the Sultanate of Sulu.
1451	Malacca became the center of Islam in southeast Asia.
1456	Tun Perak lead the Malaccan army to victory by defeating Siamese invaders in Batu Pahat. He was made Bendahara of Malacca.
1459	Emperor of China sent his daughter Hang Li Po and 500 followers as a gift to Sultan Mansur Shah. Sultan Mansur Shah established Bukit Cina as a settlement for the Chinese.
1463	Malacca established diplomatic ties with Ryukyu. Ryukyu traders were respected in Malacca.
1470	Tun Besar, a son of Tun Perak was killed because he had accidentally displaced Raja Muhammad's destar, a prince of Malacca.
1470	Raja Muhammad was exiled to Pahang and founded the Pahang Sultanate.

== 16th century ==
Year	Date	Event
1509	11 September	Diogo Lopes de Sequeira, the first European to reach the Far East, arrived in Malacca.
1511	24 August	Malacca came under Portuguese rule after falling to an army led by Alfonso de Albuquerque.
1511	November	Flor de la Mar, carrying a large treasure trove from Malacca, sank near Sumatran coast.
1511		Panglima Awang was acquired as a slave by the Portuguese explorer Ferdinand Magellan
1512		Fortress of Malacca, the oldest European architectural remains in the Far East, was built in Malacca.
1512		The first Portuguese expedition was sent eastward from Malacca to search for the Spice Islands led by Francisco Serrão.
1521	21 April	The Magellan Expedition was received with hostility by the Mactan natives, led by Lapu-Lapu. Panglima Awang was believed to have left Mactan and made his way back to the Malay Peninsula, becoming the first person in recorded history to circumnavigate the world.
1521		Brunei was visited by Magellan expedition.
1521		The Church of Saint Paul was built the oldest church building in Southeast Asia.
1522		The first Malay-Italian dictionary was compiled by Antonio Pigafetta, who accompanied Ferdinand Magellan around the globe. The dictionary contains about 426 words related to trade in the Moluccas.
1528		Johor Sultanate was founded by Raja Alauddin, son of Mahmud Shah, the last king of Malacca.
1528		Perak Sultanate was founded by Raja Muzaffar, also a son of Mahmud Shah.
1540		Luak Rembau is founded.
1545		Francis Xavier arrived in Malacca and devoted his life to missions in Asia, especially in Malacca and Maluku Islands.
1547		Francis Xavier met a Japanese man named Anjirō who had traveled from Kagoshima to Malacca to meet him and become the first Japanese Christian.
1548		Francis Xavier established a school on the premises of the chapel known as Church of Saint Paul.
1548		Cik Siti Wan Kembang became Sultan of Kelantan.
1563		Kota Jelasin was built for Cik Siti Wan Kembang and her adopted daughter, Puteri Saadong.
1563		Manuel Godinho de Erédia, a Malay-Portuguese writer and cartographer of early Malay Peninsula, was born in Malacca.
1577		Sultan Mansur Shah was abducted by the Acehnese forces. Acehnese forces captured the Sultan's widow and children and brought them back to Aceh.
1577		Raja Alauddin, a prince of Perak was married to an Acehnese princess and installed as the Sultan of Aceh.
1577		Perak nobles journeyed to Acehnese and requested Alauddin Mansur Syah be a successor. He sent his brother to become Perak's monarch to maintain the unbroken Malacca dynasty lineage.
1578		Castilian War: War broke out between Brunei and Spain in Borneo and Mindanao.
1578		Sulu Sultanate gained its independence from Brunei.
1594		Perak rotational succession system among members of the royal family began.
1598		Raja Tengah accepted the offer by the Sultan of Brunei to be the Sultan of Sarawak

== 17th century ==
Year	Date	Event
1603	25 February	Dutch led by Jacob van Heemskerk with the assistance of Johor, seized the Portuguese merchant vessel Santa Catarina off the coast of Singapore.
1603		Malay-Dutch vocabulary, the earliest Malay book printed in Europe, was published by Frederick de Houtman in Amsterdam.
1612		Sejarah Melayu was composed by Tun Sri Lanang, the Bendahara of Johor.
1613		Aceh attacked Johor in Batu Sawar. Tun Sri Lanang was captured and taken to Aceh.
1614		Pahang was ruled by Johor.
1635		Raja Kuning of Patani married the Yang di-Pertuan Muda of Johor.
1636		Perak nobles turned to Sultan Iskandar Thani of Aceh who sent his relative, Raja Sulong, to be the sultan of Perak because the previous sultan died without an heir and many royal family members died due to an epidemic that swept through the sultanate. Raja Sulong was a prince of Siak and was not genealogically linked to Perak royalty on his father's side.
1641		Dutch, with the help from Johor, conquered Malacca from the Portuguese. Hikayat Hang Tuah was composed by an unknown writer from Johor after the Portuguese defeat in Malacca.
1644		Tarian Asyik was created to comfort the mourning Raja Kuning after the loss of her beloved bird.
1650		Kelantan became a part of the Patani founded by Raja Sakti I.
1653		Kota Sena was established by Muhyiddin Mansur Shah as a capital of Kedah.
1660		The Brunei Civil War began over a disagreement between the son of the Sultan of Brunei, Pengiran Muda Bongsu, and Pengiran Muda Alam, the son of Pengiran Abdul Mubin, over the results of a cockfight which Pengiran Muda Bungsu lost.
1666	September	Kedah was under Thai sovereignty.
1667		Puteri Saadong ruled the territory of Kota Jelasin.
1670		Kelantan split into two, Kelantan Barat (center in Kota Kubang Labu) and Kelantan Timur (center in Kota Pangkalan Datu).
1671		Puteri Saadong managed to heal the King Narai of Siam, who promised her freedom if she could cure his disease. Puteri Saadong returned to Kota Jelasin and killed her husband, Raja Abdullah, who had remarried another princess in her absence.
1673		Johor-Jambi war: Jambi attacked Johor in Johor Lama.
1673		Brunei Civil War: The Eastern part of Sabah was given to Sulu as the reward for assisting the Muhyiddin's forces.
1679		Johor-Jambi war: Tun Abdul Jamil defeated Jambi, so ending the Johor-Jambi war.
1699		Tun Abdul Jalil, the Bendahara of Johor was elected as the Sultan of Johor, after the dead of "Sultan Mahmud Mangkat Dijulang".

== 18th century ==
Year	Date	Event
1700		Luak Sungai Ujong was founded.
1701		First original Malay-English dictionary by Thomas Bowrey was printed in London.
1704		Sultan of Brunei ceded the lands east of Marudu Bay to the Sultanate of Sulu.
1708		Terengganu Sultanate was founded by Zainal Abidin I, son of Tun Habib Abdul Majid, the Bendahara of Johor.
1718		Abdul Jalil Shah IV was overthrown by Raja Kecik from Siak and was supported by Minangkabau forces.
1722		Raja Sulaiman, a son of Abdul Jalil Shah IV was overthrown by Raja Kecik with the help of five Bugis warrior – Daeng Parani, Daeng Marewah, Daeng Chelak, Daeng Menambun, and Daeng Kamasi.
1722		Daeng Marewah was elected as the first Yang di-Pertuan Muda of Johor.
1750		Luak Teraci was founded, under the suzerainty of Sungai Ujong.
1750		Luak Gunung Pasir was founded, under the suzerainty of Rembau.
1750		Luak Ulu Muar was founded, under the suzerainty of Johol.
1750		Luak Jempol was founded, under the suzerainty of Jelebu.
1750		Luak Inas (Jelai) was founded.
1757		Tun Abdul Jamal was elected as the first Temenggong of Johor, direct ancestor to the House of Temenggong.
1762		Long Yunus, a prince from Kota Kubang Labu, succeeded in uniting both Kelantan Barat and Kelantan Timur.
1766		Selangor Sultanate was founded by Raja Lumu, son of Daeng Chelak, the Yang di-Pertuan Muda of Johor.
1767		Kedah was under Burmese sovereignty after the fall of Ayutthaya
1769		Kedah once again was under Thai sovereignty.
1770		Penghulu Luak of Sungai Ujong, Jelebu, Johol and Rembau invited a prince of the Minangkabau in Sumatra to rule Negeri Sembilan.
1773		Negeri Sembilan was established as a confederation of nine states, with Raja Melewar as its first Yamtuan Besar.
1784		Raja Haji Fisabilillah, the Yang di-Pertuan Muda of Johor, led a series of raids against the Dutch in Malacca and died at Teluk Ketapang.
1786	11 August	Penang was founded by Francis Light and was named "Prince of Wales Island"
1795		Administration of Malacca was given to the British following the Kew Letters.
1796		Abdullah bin Abdul Kadir, the father of modern Malay literature was born in Malacca
1800		Seberang Perai was ceded to Penang and was named "Province Wellesley"

== 19th century ==
Year	Date	Event
1807		Fortress of Malacca was almost totally demolished but was saved by Stamford Raffles.
1808		Raja Ali Haji, a grandson of Raja Haji Fisabilillah was born in Selangor or Johor-Pahang-Riau-Lingga. As a scholar and historian, he led the renaissance of Malay letters.
1809	June	Kedah helped Siam during the Burmese invasion of Tanjung Salang
1811		Malay gamelan was first performed in public in Pekan during the wedding ceremony of Tengku Hussain, the son of Sultan Mahmud Shah of Johor-Pahang-Riau-Lingga, with Wan Esah, a sister of Raja Bendahara Tun Ali of Pahang.
1811		Sultan Mahmud Shah died in Lingga, the throne of Johor-Pahang-Riau-Lingga went instead to Tengku Jummat, who was supported by the Bugis in Lingga but opposed by the Malay chiefs in Riau and Pahang who were supporters of Tengku Hussain
1816		Sekolah Melayu Gelugor was established in Penang, the first Malay school.
1816		Penang Free School was built in Penang, the first English school.
1818		Malacca was once again ruled by the Dutch following the end of the Napoleonic Wars
1819	6 February	Stamford Raffles, Temenggong Abdul Rahman and Tengku Hussain signed a treaty, marking Singapore as a British settlement.
1820		Cantonese-dominated Ghee Hin and Hakka-dominated Hai San, two main secret societies in Malaya were established.
1821	November	Kedah was invaded by the Siamese forces, a few years after Mahsuri's execution.
1822	27 November	Tengku Jummat was proclaimed the Sultan of Johor-Pahang-Riau-Lingga with strong support from Raja Jaafar, Yang di-Pertuan Muda of Johor-Pahang-Riau-Lingga and the Dutch
1824	17 March	Anglo-Dutch Treaty of 1824 was signed by the United Kingdom and the Netherlands, partitioning the southern Malay states, Johor-Pahang-Riau-Lingga between British Malaya and Dutch East Indies.
1826	20 June	Burney Treaty was signed between Siam and the United Kingdom, partitioning the northern Malay states between British Malaya and Siam.
1826		Straits Settlements were established, consisting of Penang, Malacca and Singapore.
1826		Alexander Hare, an English adventurer, brought his Malay harem and enslaved people from the Malay Archipelago to the Cocos Islands, forming a community called Cocos Malays.
1831		Naning War: The opposition of Dol Said to British taxation policy in Naning led to the Naning War.
1832		Luak Tampin was founded.
1833		Naning War: Dol Said surrendered to British forces in return for an official pardon, so ending the Naning War.
1836		Malays and Bidayuhs of the Sarawak River basin revolted and proclaimed their independence from Brunei.
1839		Kedah was divided into four administrative units by Siam, Setul, Perlis, Kubang Pasu and Kedah.
1839	15 August	James Brooke first arrived in Kuching.
1840	20 December	James Brooke and Serib Japper negotiated and accepted the surrender of Siniawan Rebels in Upper Sarawak
1841	14 February	James Brooke received permission from the Sultan of Brunei to trade and reside in Sarawak
1841	24 September	Sarawak was ruled by James Brooke.
1843		Siam recognized Syed Hussin Jamalullail as the ruler of Perlis.
1846	8 July	Brunei was captured by the British
1846	August	Brunei ceded Sarawak - Tg. Datu to the mouth of Samarrahan to James Brooke
1846	18 December	Brunei ceded Labuan to the British
1853	January	Rentap forces attacked Brooke's fort in Nanga Skrang and killed Alan Lee, a British officer.
1855		Ali Wallace was recruited as a cook for Alfred Russel Wallace in his explorations and was later responsible for independently collecting many significant specimens that are credited to Wallace.
1859	25 June	Sharif Masahor forces attacked Brooke's fort in Kanowit and killed Charles Fox and Henry Steele, two British officers.
1861	July	First Larut War: Hai San Society tried to sabotage Ghee Hin's waterway.
1865		Second Larut War: Started over a gambling quarrel between members of Ghee Hin and Hai San.
1867		Klang War: Raja Mahadi challenged Raja Abdullah for authority over Klang.
1867	1 April	Straits Settlements came under direct British control as a crown colony.
1866		Baju Kurung Telok Belanga, a version of Baju Kurung was designed by Sultan Abu Bakar and named after the centre of the Johor at that time. Baju Kurung is the national dress of Malaysia.
1869		Yap Ah Loy became the Kapitan of Kuala Lumpur
1870		Klang War: Ghee Hin had joined Raja Mahadi's forces, and Hai San had sided with Tengku Kudin.
1871		Third Larut War: Began with an affair between Ghee Hin's leader and a member of Hai San and conflict of Perak succession between Raja Abdullah and Raja Ismail.
1873		Fourth Larut War: Quarrelling Malay chiefs had taken sides in the Larut Wars, by showing support to the quarreling Chinese secret societies.
1873		Klang War: Tengku Kudin, with British aid, a Pahang army, and his Chinese allies, defeated Raja Mahadi and his supporters.
1874	20 January	Pangkor Treaty of 1874 was signed, signaling the British involvement in the policies of the Malays, and the establishment of British Malaya.
1874		War broke out in Sungai Ujong between the forces of Dato' Kelana and Dato' Bandar. British sided with Dato' Kelana and defeated Dato' Bandar, and Sungai Ujong felt British dominance.
1875	2 November	Perak War: James W. W. Birch, the first Resident of Perak was assassinated by Malay chief, Dato Maharaja Lela's forces in Pasir Salak.
1875	7 November	Perak War: Sultan of Perak and Malay chiefs attempted to end foreign influence in the region.
1875		A Persian theatre company from Bombay performed in Penang, led to the creation of Bangsawan.
1876		Perak War: Raja Abdullah, Ngah Ibrahim and Mohammad Amin were exiled to the Seychelles.
1877	20 January	Perak War: Dato' Maharaja Lela was executed by hanging in Taiping.
1882	May	North Borneo became a British protectorate under the sovereign North Borneo Chartered Company.
1885		The first Railway track was built connecting Taiping with Port Weld.
1887		Terengganu Inscription Stone was discovered by villagers in Kuala Berang.
1895		Terusan Wan Mat Saman was built by the Prime Minister of Kedah, connecting Alor Setar with Gurun, the longest aqueduct in Malaysia.
1895		Undang-undang Tubuh Kerajaan Johor was introduced by Sultan Abu Bakar, the first written constitution in Malaysia.
1896		Selangor, Perak, Negeri Sembilan and Pahang joined to become the Federated Malay States, a federation of British protectorates.
1897		Mat Salleh Rebellion: Mat Salleh forces attacked and destroyed the British's administrative center in Pulau Gaya.

== 20th century ==
Year	Date	Event
1909	10 March	The Anglo-Siamese Treaty of 1909 was signed by the United Kingdom and Thailand, effectively dissecting the northern Malay states.
1914	28 October	Battle of Penang: The German cruiser SMS Emden sank two Allied warships in the Strait of Malacca.
1915	29 April – 24 May	Kelantan Rebellion: Villagers led by Tok Janggut resisted British taxes and land control before being suppressed.
1915		William Kellie Smith, a Scottish planter started the construction project of Kellie's Castle in Batu Gajah, Perak.
1922		Haji Abdul Rahman Limbong represented one of the 43 farmers being put to trial in a court for doing farming without permission.
1928		Haji Abdul Rahman Limbong assembled about 1,000 people in Kampung Buluh to launch their resistance to get the British out of their state. Several police stations were attacked in Kuala Berang.
1941	7 December	Attack on Pearl Harbor: Japan opened hostilities with the Allies and their colonies.
1941	8 December	Japanese occupation of Malaya: Japanese forces invaded and began the occupation of British Malaya.
1941	16 December	Japanese occupation of British Borneo: Japanese forces invaded and began the occupation of British Borneo.
1941	10 December	The British battleship HMS Prince of Wales and the battlecruiser HMS Repulse were sunk by Japanese bombers.
1942	14 January	Battle of Muar: The last major battle of the Malayan campaign was fought.
1942	23 January	Parit Sulong Massacre: Allied soldiers were massacred by Japanese forces.
1942	9 February	Battle of Singapore: The Japanese crossed the Strait of Johor in inflatable boats and landed in Singapore.
1942	13 February	Battle of Pasir Panjang: A Malay regiment led by Lieutenant Adnan bin Saidi fought bravely against the Japanese at Pasir Panjang Ridge.
1942	1 September	Almost 100 leading members of the Malayan Peoples' Anti-Japanese Army were killed by the Japanese near the Batu Caves. Their secret location was betrayed by their leader Lai Teck, who was a double agent.
1942	18 October	Kedah became the Thai possession of Syburi.
1944	11 January	World War II: Action of 11 January 1944
1944	17 July	World War II: Action of 17 July 1944
1945	January	Sandakan Death Marches, marches forced by the Japanese, began.
1945	June	Sandakan Death Marches concluded.
1945	27 June	Battle of North Borneo: A battle was fought between the Australians and Japanese.
1945	14 August	Japan surrendered, leaving a power vacuum.
1945	5 September	The British returned and established a military administration in the Straits Settlements.
1945	23 September	Kedah and the three other states were returned to the British.
1946	29 January	Communist allied trade unions staged a successful 24-hour general strike across Malaya.
1946	8 February	Charles Vyner Brooke declared that the Sarawak Supreme Council agreed on the cession of Sarawak to the British.
1946	1 April	The Straits Settlements were dissolved and replaced by the Malayan Union, conceived to unify the Malay Peninsula under a single government.
1946	1 July	The British officially declared Sarawak as the Crown Colony of Sarawak
1948	31 January	Opposition from Malay nationalists forced the Malayan Union to disband in favour of the Federation of Malaya, which restored the symbolic positions of the rulers of the Malay states.
1948	16 June	European-owned plantations and tin mines in Malaya were attacked by Communists in an event known as the Sungai Siput incident. This event is recognised as the beginning of the Malayan Emergency (1948-1960).
1948	16 July	Death of Lau Yew: British security forces clashed with those of the Malayan Communist Party, resulting in the death of one of their key leaders, Lau Yew.
1948	12 December	The Batang Kali massacre: The Scots Guards of the British Army murdered 24 unarmed civilians.
1949	4 May	British forces hung S. A. Ganapathy, the former president of Malaya's largest trade union.
1949	21 May	The 10th Malay Regiment was founded. This is the only predominantly Malay regiment to exist belonging to the Malayan National Liberation Army during the Malayan Emergency.
1949	8 October	The University of Malaya was established following the merger of Raffles College and King Edward Medical College.
1949	3 December	Rosli Dhobi and several members from Rukun 13 orchestrated the assassination of the Governor of Sarawak, Sir Duncan Stewart in Sibu.
1950	23 February	Bukit Kepong Incident: An armed encounter took place between Communists and the police.
1951	6 October	Assassination of Sir Henry Gurney: British High Commissioner Sir Henry Gurney was killed by members of the Malayan Communist Party in Fraser's Hill.
1952	28 April - May	The British communist newspaper the Daily Worker leaked photographs of British soldiers in Malay posing with the severed heads of guerrillas belonging to the Malayan National Liberation Army, a common practice among British forces during the Malayan Emergency. These photographs created an uproar among British politicians and military leaders. Winston Churchill ordered Gerald Templer to stop this practice.
1955	28-29 December	Baling Talks: A talk between representatives of the government of Malaya and Malayan Communist Party to resolve the Malayan Emergency situation. Tan Cheng Lock, David Marshall and Tunku Abdul Rahman represented the government whereas Chin Peng, Rashid Maidin and Chen Tien represented the communists. However, the talks were unsuccessful because the surrender terms were unacceptable to the Malayan Communist Party.
1956	18 January	A constitutional conference proposed the appointment of the Reid Commission to devise a constitution for a fully self-governing and independent Federation of Malaya.
1956	8 February	Treaty of London (1956) was signed to set up the independent Federation of Malaya.
1956	20 February	Tunku Abdul Rahman announced in Malacca Town after he returned from London that Malaya would become independent on 31 August 1957.
1957	21 February	The Reid Commission submitted its working draft to a Working Committee.
1957	1 July	Berita Harian (BH), a Malay-language daily newspaper, was founded.
1957	31 July	Federation of Malaya Independence Act 1957 was enforced in London
1957	15 August	The new Federal Constitution was passed by the Federal Legislative Council.
1957	27 August	The Federation of Malayan constitution took effect for the first time.
1957	30 August	Stadium Merdeka was officially opened.
1957	31 August	Historical midnight started with the Union Jack flag, which was lowered for the first time along with the British national anthem, "God Save the King" and replaced by the independent Federation of Malaya flag with the national anthem, "Negaraku".
1957	31 August	Early in the morning, the proclamation of independence was held in the Stadium Merdeka, Kuala Lumpur, with a historical shout of "Merdeka" 7 times by the first Prime Minister, Tunku Abdul Rahman.
1957	31 August	Malaya joined Commonwealth of Nations
1957	1 September	Tuanku Abdul Rahman of Negeri Sembilan was installed as the first Yang di-Pertuan Agong at Istana Negara.
1957	17 September	Federation of Malaya joined the United Nations.
1957	30 October	Alliance Party was fully registered as a coalition party.
1959	26 January	Central Bank of Malaysia, which is known as Bank Negara Tanah Melayu, was founded.
1959	19 August	The first election was held since Independence. The Alliance won most of the seats.
1959	12 September	The Yang di-Pertuan Agong opened the first Malayan Parliament.
1960	31 May	Malayan Banking Berhad, which known as Maybank, was incorporated.
1960	22 June	Internal Security Act (ISA) 1960 was passed by Dewan Rakyat, effective August 1960.
1960	28 July	Hibiscus rosa-sinensis, known as Bunga Raya, was declared the Malayan national flower.
1960	31 July	End of state of emergency against Communist Party declared by Yang Di-Pertuan Agong, Sultan Hishamuddin Alam Shah, but conflict continued until 1989. A victory parade was held in Kuala Lumpur on the same day.
1961	27 May	Malayan Prime Minister Tunku Abdul Rahman proposed a "Malaysia" merger between Peninsular Malaya, Singapore, North Borneo and Sarawak.
1962	19 January	Dato' Onn Jaafar, the founder of UMNO, died. His body was laid to rest at Makam Mahmoodiah, Johor Bahru.
1962	17 January	Cobbold Commission: The Cobbold Commission was a Commission of Enquiry set up to determine whether the people of East Malaysia who supported the Federation of Malaysia proposal, which consisted of Malaya, Brunei, Singapore, North Borneo, and Sarawak.
1962	19 April	Stadium Negara, Malaya's first indoor stadium, was officially opened.
1962	1 September	A referendum on the terms of integration into the Federation of Malaysia was held in Singapore.
1962	8-17 December	Brunei revolt: The insurrection of Brunei by opponents with Indonesia supportive against Brunei monarchy and its proposal Malaysia began, later influenced the Sultan of Brunei to reject Malaysia's proposal, thus marked the beginning of the Indonesia–Malaysia confrontation.
1963	20 January	Indonesia–Malaysia confrontation: Indonesian Foreign Minister Subandrio announced that Indonesia would declared Confrontation or konfrontasi against proposed Federation of Malaysia.
1963	11 March	The National Language Act 1963 was gazetted by Dewan Rakyat.
1963	9 July	The Malaysia Agreement was signed by the governments of the United Kingdom, Malaya, Singapore, North Borneo and Sarawak.
1963	22 July	Sarawak was granted the establishment of de facto self-government and independence before Malaysia's formation.
1963	31 July	Malaysia Act 1963, which provisioned Malaya, Sarawak, Sabah, and Singapore came into operation in the United Kingdom.
1963	31 July	Manila Accord was signed by the governments of Malaya (now Malaysia), Indonesia, and Philippines.
1963	31 August	Sabah was granted the establishment of de facto self-government and independence before Malaysia's formation.
1963	31 August	Muzium Negara, the first national museum, was officially opened.
1963	16 September	Malaysia establishment: Malaya, Singapore, Sabah and Sarawak merged to form Malaysia.
1963	14 November	The National Zoo of Malaysia, known as "Zoo Negara" was officially opened.
1963	21 November	The Malaysian Houses of Parliament, known as "Bangunan Parliament", was officially opened.
1963	28 December	Television of Malaysia was launched by the then Prime Minister, Tunku Abdul Rahman.
1964	25 April	Elections were held for the first time since the formation of Malaysia. Alliance won most of the seats, but the Singapore party, People's Action Party (PAP) won 1 seat in Selangor. This PAP victory sent outrage and an angry reaction to UMNO and threatened Malaysian politics.
1964	21 July	Race riots, which involved Malays and Chinese, occurred during the Prophet Muhammad's birthday celebration in Singapore, resulting in 23 killed, 454 injured, and 3568 arrested.
1964	2 September	Second race riots happened again in Singapore due to the murder of a Malay trishaw rider, resulting in 13 killed, 106 sustained injuries, and 1,439 being arrested.
1965	10 March	Bomb blast was detonated by Indonesian saboteurs at the MacDonald House building in Orchard Road, Singapore.
1965	27 May	Singapore's PAP leader, Lee Kuan Yew, joined several other multiracial parties in announcing the formation of the Malaysia Solidarity Convention or Malaysian Malaysia, sparking controversy among Malay leaders over Malaysia's sovereignty.
1965	7 August	The Proclamation of Singapore was agreed by Malaysia and the Singapore government that Singapore would be separated from Malaysia as an independent and sovereign nation after Malaysia and Singapore did not find any alternative solution to those concerned national issues.
1965	9 August	Exit Singapore: Malaysian Parliament voted to expel Singapore from Malaysia, giving Singapore to become an independent nation.
1965	27 August	The National Mosque, also known as "Masjid Negara", was declared open by then Yang Di-Pertuan Agong, Tuanku Syed Putra.
1965	30 August	Subang International Airport was officially opened.
1965	14 - 21 December 1965	SEAP Games were held by then Agong, Sultan Nasiruddin, in Stadium Merdeka, Kuala Lumpur, for the first time.
1966	7 February	The exchange of notes by the government of Malaysia (formerly Malaya) and the Philippines constituted an agreement relating to the implementation of the Manila Accord of 31 July 1963.
1966	8 February	The National Monument, known as "Tugu Negara" was officially opened by then Agong, Ismail Nasiruddin.
1966	11 August	The final peace agreement was signed with Indonesia, which formally recognized Malaysia, marking the end of the Malaysia-Indonesia confrontation
1966	30 - 31 October	US President, Lyndon B. Johnson made historic visit to Malaysia. This is the first US President to set foot on Malaysian soil.
1967	February	Communist insurgency in Malaysia (1968–1989): A renewed insurgency was conducted by the Malayan Communist Party against Malaysian federal security forces.
1967	9 - 10 June	1967 Thomas Cup: The Malaysian badminton team defeated Indonesia by 6-3 in the final. This is the fourth title for Malaysian badminton.
1967	12 June	The Malaysian ringgit (Malaysian dollar) was officially introduced, replacing the Malayan and British Borneo dollars.
1967	1 July	Full immigration control at the Malaysia-Singapore border was imposed with the beginning of passport checks at the Johor Immigration Center.
1967	8 August	ASEAN Declaration: Malaysia signed the Bangkok Declaration with Thailand, Indonesia, Philippines, and Singapore to form ASEAN.
1967	1 September	Malay, known as "Bahasa Malaysia", was declared the national language.
1968	17 February	The Angkasapuri, the new main information building for the government and also the headquarters for Radio Television Malaysia (RTM), was officially opened in Lembah Pantai, Kuala Lumpur, Malaysia. Shortly after, Radio Malaysia and Television Malaysia (RTM) service were moved from Tunku Abdul Rahman multipurpose hall at Jalan Ampang to the Angkasapuri.
1968	20 May	Malaysian National News Agency, known as "BERNAMA" was formed.
1969	10 May	1969 Malaysian general election: Alliance won 4th general election in West Malaysia but suffered a loss of two-thirds majority in Parliament for the first time since Independence. Alliance also lost government power to the Opposition in Perak, Selangor, Penang, and Kelantan.
1969	13 May	13 May incident: Ethnic riots between Malays and Chinese occurred in Kuala Lumpur after the election. Violence quickly spread to various locations in Selangor and some other states.
1969	14 - 16 May	The then-Agong, Sultan Ismail Nasiruddin Shah, immediately declared a state of emergency and curfew throughout the country. Security forces were deployed and took control of the violent situation.
1969	15 May	National Operations Council (NOC) was established with Deputy Prime Minister Tun Abdul Razak as Director of Operations to act as a temporary legislative council to restore law and order in Malaysia after the 13 May riots.
1969		Parliament session was suspended for 18 months to contain racial tensions. Newspaper publications were suspended but resumed later on 18 May.
1969	12 July	UMNO Kedah leader Mahathir Mohamad was sacked by UMNO for being critical of Tunku's leadership and urged Tunku to resign.
1969	26 December	Mat Kilau, Malay legend hero, shockilly revealed himself after Friday prayers at Masjid Kampung Pulau Tawar, Jerantut, Pahang. His identity was confirmed later by the state and government committee. One year later, he died at the age of 105.
1970	4 April	Malaysia's first satellite station was commissioned in Kuantan, Pahang.
1970	31 August	Rukun Negara, the national philosophy was instituted by royal proclamation on Merdeka Day, after the 13 May incident.
1970	22 September	Tun Abdul Razak was appointed second Prime Minister after Tunku Abdul Rahman resigned. Tun Dr Ismail was appointed Deputy Prime Minister the same day.
1971	5 January	A significant flash flood occurred in Kuala Lumpur after heavy monsoon rains that swelled the Klang, Batu, and Gombak rivers. Thirty-two people were killed.
1971	11 July	After the 13 May incident in Malaysia, the government launched a new affirmative action program, the New Economic Policy, known as "Dasar Ekonomi Baru (DEB)". This policy gave rise to its formulation, objectives, implementation methods, and overall impact on the Malaysian economy.
1971	9 September	The Star, a new Malaysian newspaper, was established.
1972	1 February	Kuala Lumpur was awarded city status, and Tan Sri Dato' Lokman bin Yusof was appointed the first Kuala Lumpur mayor.
1972	22 February - 8 March	Queen Elizabeth II and other royal family visited Malaysia by arriving onboard the Royal Yacht Britannia at Port Klang during an eight-country royal tour of Asia. Then-Agong Sultan Abdul Halim welcomed her visit.
1973	29 May	Famous Malaysian actor and singer P. Ramlee died at the age of 44 from a heart attack and was buried at Jalan Ampang Muslim Cemetery in Kuala Lumpur
1973	2 August	Deputy Prime Minister Tun Dr Ismail Abdul Rahman died from a heart attack. He was the first national leader to be laid to rest in Makam Pahlawan, Masjid Negara, Kuala Lumpur. Dato Onn's son, Tun Hussein Onn, was appointed deputy the next day.
1974	1 February	Kuala Lumpur was awarded as first Federal Territory state.
1974	28 May	Prime Minister Tun Abdul Razak visited China for the first time and met Chairman Mao Zedong and Premier Zhou Enlai in Beijing, thus making Malaysia establish diplomatic ties with the People's Republic of China.
1974	1 June	Barisan Nasional (BN) was fully registered as a new coalition party, thus replacing the previous Alliance Party.
1974	7 June	Communist rebels in Kuala Lumpur assassinated Inspector General of Police Tan Sri Abdul Rahman Hashim.
1974	17 August	Petronas, the first Malaysian petroleum and gas company, was founded.
1974	24 August	Barisan Nasional (BN) won the fifth election for the first time.
1974	15 September	More than 100 houses of poor urban settler families in Tasek Utara, Johor Bahru, were demolished, causing 300 people from 60 families to lose their homes. Student leaders from various universities came to support those poor villagers and pleaded with state authorities to stop demolishing their homes, but their demand was ignored.
1974	16 September	In response to demolished homes, those Malay squatters set up their tents to camp outside the Johor State Secretariat Building, where they picketed day and night in protest against demolishing their homes; some student leaders from various universities witnessed this protest.
1974	19 September	Malaysian police and police riot quietly entered the campsite and arrested five people, including some student leaders, causing outrage and public outcry to other universities.
1974	20 September	More than 2,500 students from University Malaya took part in a street demonstration outside the Prime Minister's Department to demand the release of student leaders who struggle to support Tasek Utara squatter families.
1974	21 September	Universiti Malaya (UM) student activists, including the University of Malaya Students' Association, took over the administration and campus of the UM to demand the release of two student leaders arrested in Johor Bahru yesterday. This coup lasted for one day. On the same day, 1,000 student activists demonstrated outside the UM campus for the same demand. Malaysian riot police blocked the student demonstration by firing tear gas, and some students were arrested.
1974	9 November	The Baling demonstration began with more than 1,000 peasants. The demonstration was triggered by a price increase in food and a decline in rubber, which affected most of the Baling district's residents, mainly rubber smallholders in Baling, Kedah.
1974	20 November	Demonstrations continued in Baling, Kedah, and surrounding areas to urge the government to resolve the inflation issues. The next day, Baling event participation continued to increase, with more than 13,000 people participating.
1974	1 December	Demonstrations in Baling, Kedah, continued to grow, with more than 30,000 people protesting due to the late response by the Malaysian government to tackle the same issue.
1974	1 December	Bank Simpanan Nasional (BSN) was founded.
1974	3 December	More than 5,000 students took to the streets to demonstrate at Dataran Merdeka to support the previous Baling protest, demanding that the government solve inflation issues. Malaysian riot police dispersed these peaceful street demonstrations with tear gas and arrested many participating students.
1974	9 December	Student leaders, including Anwar Ibrahim, were arrested in connection to the street demonstration. They were also detained under ISA 1960.
1975	5 August	1975 AIA building hostage crisis: Japanese Red Army took more than 50 hostages at the AIA building, which housed several embassies.
1975	27 August	The National Monument statue suffered damage due to an explosion that a communist guerrilla set off. Since then, it has been restored to its original state with the renovated statues 2 years later.
1976	14 January	Prime Minister Tun Abdul Razak died at 53 in London due to leukemia. His body was flown back to Malaysia 2 days later and was laid to rest at Makam Pahlawan, Masjid Negara, Kuala Lumpur.
1976	15 January	Tun Hussein Onn was sworn in as the third Prime Minister.
1976	5 March	Tun Dr Mahathir Mohamad was appointed Deputy Prime Minister.
1976	6 June	Sabah chief minister and former state Yang di-Pertua Negeri (Governor), Tun Fuad Stephens, one crew among nine passengers were killed in a plane crash near Kota Kinabalu. Tun Fuad Stephens' body was later interred at the State Mausoleum near Sabah State Mosque, Kota Kinabalu.
1977	24 April	A car racing in the unlimited formula car race on the program with the Malaysian Grand Prix ran off the track into a group of spectators today, killing five children and injuring 19 other people.
1977	27 September	Japan Air Lines Flight 715, which carried 69 passengers and 10 crew members, has crashed near Subang International Airport, leaving 45 people injured and 34 casualties.
1977	8 November	1977 Kelantan Emergency: The state of emergency was declared by the Yang di-Pertuan Agong (King of Malaysia) upon the request of the federal government following a political impasse and street violence in Kelantan.
1977	4 December	Malaysian Airline System Flight 653 (MH653) crashed at Tanjung Kupang, Johor, while purportedly being diverted by hijackers to Singapore, leaving 100 people dead, including Agricultural Minister Dato' Ali Haji Ahmad. It was the first deadliest air crash disaster for Malaysia Airlines in history.
1979	21 December	Pedra Branca dispute: Singapore lodged a formal protest with Malaysia in response to a map published by Malaysia in 1979 claiming Pedra Branca.
1980	6 April	The Malaysian football team qualified for the 1980 Summer Olympics football tournament after defeating South Korea by 2-1 in a play-off match at Stadium Merdeka, Kuala Lumpur. Later, Malaysia was replaced by Iraq because the Government joined the American-led political boycott of the Soviet Union in protest of the Soviet invasion of Afghanistan.
1981	16 July	Mahathir Mohamad was sworn in as fourth Prime Minister. Musa Hitam was appointed as deputy the next day.
1981	7 September	Guthrie Dawn Raid, a quietly secret Malaysia plan, occurred when Malaysia took over Guthrie Corporation Limited, the biggest British-owned plantations group in Malaysia, through Pemodalan Nasional Berhad (PNB) which bought up Guthrie's share at the London Stock Exchange and secured a majority control in series of quick tradings in the early morning, caused those British Guthrie investors lost control of Malaysia's agricultural land.
1982	1 January	The time zone in Peninsular Malaysia and Singapore changed to UTC+08:00 and has not changed since.
1982	29 May	McDonald's, an American fast food chain, opened its first restaurant at Jalan Bukit Bintang, Kuala Lumpur.
1984	16 April	Labuan became a second Federal Territory state in Malaysia. This is the first Federal Territory in East Malaysia along Borneo states.
1984	1 June	Sistem Televisyen Malaysia Berhad, which known as TV3, Malaysia's first private television channel, was launched.
1985	10 July	Proton Saga, the first national car, was officially launched by then Prime Minister Mahathir Mohamad, marked the beginning of the car manufacturer industry in Malaysia
1985	3 August	Penang Bridge, the first national bridge, officially opened and later, opened to traffic on 14 September 1985.
1985	19 November	Memali Incident: The worst clash occurred between police and Ibrahim Mahmud (Libya)'s followers, killing four police officers and 14 followers. One hundred fifty-nine followers were arrested, including 36 people under ISA 1960.
1986	26 February	Sabah Chief Minister and United Sabah Party (PBS) president Joseph Pairin Kitingan asked Sabah Governor Adnan Robert to dissolve the State Assembly by stating that his party has lost the majority as state government with 4 PBS assembly members left party and government, caused hung state assembly, which was weakened Sabah government and also, led to 1986 Sabah riots.
1986	12 March	1986 Sabah riots: The Sabah riots, known as the "Silent Riot" occurred. During the political riots, seven plastic explosives were detonated in Kota Kinabalu, with five other explosives in Sandakan, which killed one newspaper vendor and injured a senior Police Field Force officer and another one in Tawau.
1986	13 March	1986 Sabah riots: Curfew was announced by the Sabah's police and held for 39 days in the aftermath of the riots.
1986	16 March	Tun Musa Hitam resigned as Deputy Prime Minister due to unavoidable differences with Mahathir.
1986	24 March	After the failed solution to Sabah's political crisis, Prime Minister Mahathir Mohamad negotiated and proposed a unity government formula between PBS and two other opposition parties, USNO and BERJAYA, but PBS refused.
1986	14 April	Singer Sudirman Arshad launched the biggest street concert ever held in Chow Kit Road, Kuala Lumpur, in front of more than 100,000 fans at night.
1986	4 May	1986 Sabah state election: The snap election was held in response to civil disturbances and political defections following the results of the 1985 state election. The results showed that the United Sabah Party (PBS) won a two-thirds majority and quickly formed the Sabah government with Joseph Pairin Kitingan again as Sabah Chief Minister.
1986	10 May	Tun Ghafar Baba was appointed Deputy Prime Minister.
1986	27 June	PLUS Expressways, the Malaysian largest highway concessionary or build–operate–transfer operator company, was founded.
1986	17 - 22 October	Pudu Prison siege took place after a group of prisoners seized and held two members of the prison staff as hostages. The siege was resolved 6 days later when Malaysian police stormed the prison and successfully rescued those hostages safely.
1987	24 April	The UMNO crisis began when election leader President Mahathir, who led "Team A", was challenged by Tengku Razaleigh Hamzah, who led "Team B" for the Presidency position. Later, the official results saw Mahathir's Team A as the winner, by a thin majority, with 761 votes, to Razaleigh's Team B with 718.
1987	27 October - 20 November	Operasi Lalang, a prominent political crackdown carried out by Malaysian police, saw the arrest of 119 people, including political activists, opposition politicians, intellectuals, students, and others under the Internal Security Act (ISA) 1960.
1987	28 October	Home Ministry withdrew the licenses of the English language newspapers The Star and Sunday Star, the Chinese language Sin Chew Jit Poh, and the Malay language Watan for a temporary period. Those suspended newspapers were lifted one year later.
1988	4 February	1988 constitutional crisis: UMNO was declared an illegal organization by the Kuala Lumpur High Court due to reports by 11 Group or Kumpulan 11 which believed to be allied with Tengku Razaleigh that challenged 1987 UMNO election results.
1988	13 February	1988 constitutional crisis: The application to register UMNO Baru was submitted by then President UMNO, Mahathir Mohamad, and some pro-Mahathir's former UMNO Supreme Council Members. UMNO Baru was formed the next day and officially accepted to re-member Barisan Nasional.
1988	17 March	1988 constitutional crisis: In retaliation, the amendment was read under Article 121 of the Federal Constitution in Parliament to interpret the Malaysian judiciary system within the country's administration system. This also would be an attempt to put pressure on and attack the Malaysian judiciary system.
1988	26 March	1988 constitutional crisis: Lord President, Tun Salleh Abbas, wrote a letter to the Agong, Sultan Iskandar, to stop the Prime Minister's intervention in judiciary matters.
1988	25 May	1988 constitutional crisis: Prime Minister Mahathir Mohamad wrote to then Agong Sultan Iskandar to request that Tun Salleh Abbas be replaced with the new Lord President.
1988	9 June	1988 constitutional crisis: Prime Minister Mahathir Mohamad made a second representation to the King alleging further misconduct on the part of Tun Salleh Abbas based on his undignified use of the press to vent his grievances – such as requesting for a public hearing of the tribunal and asking for persons of high judicial standing to sit on the tribunal. 2 days later, members of the tribunal were appointed under the Federal Constitution by the King.
1988	29 June	1988 constitutional crisis: The tribunal held its proceedings on camera while Tun Salleh Abbas was accorded the right to be defended by the Queen's counsel. The tribunal found five allegations against Tun Salleh Abbas as Lord President.
1988	4 July	1988 constitutional crisis: Tribunal ended with the suspension and the eventual removal of the Lord President of the Supreme Court, Tun Salleh Abas, from his seat.
1988	31 July	Sultan Abdul Halim ferry terminal bridge collapsed in Butterworth, Penang, Malaysia, due to overcrowding and unstable steel bars, leaving 32 people dead and injuring 1,634 people.
1989	19 March	Singer Sudirman Arshad won the title "Best Performer" in the 1989 Salem Asian Music Awards at Royal Albert Hall, London, United Kingdom.
1989	22 September	Around 27 students, primarily schoolgirls, were killed in the madrasah fire tragedy in Guar Chempedak, Kedah.
1990	29 May	Former Prime Minister Tun Hussein Onn died at age 68 from heart disease in San Francisco, California. He was laid to rest at Makam Pahlawan, Masjid Negara, Kuala Lumpur.
1990	6 December	Former Prime Minister Tunku Abdul Rahman Putra Al-Haj died at 87. His body was brought back to Kedah and laid to rest at Kedah Royal Mausoleum, Langgar, Kedah.
1991	7 May	Bright Sparklers Fireworks disaster occurred in Sungai Buloh, Selangor, after the fireworks factory caught fire and caused a massive explosion, leaving 26 people killed and over 100 people injured in the disaster. Some local houses and residential properties had damaged roofs due to the same blast.
1992	22 February	Singer Sudirman Arshad died at 39 at his sister's house in Bangsar, Kuala Lumpur. His body is brought back to his hometown in Temerloh, Pahang, and laid to rest at Chengal Muslim Cemetery.
1992	16 May	1992 Thomas & Uber Cup: After 25 years, Malaysia's men's badminton team won the fifth Thomas Cup at Stadium Negara, Kuala Lumpur, beating Indonesia with an aggregate of 3–2
1992	10 July	The second son of the Sultan of Johor, Tunku Abdul Majid, probably lost his temper and assaulted a Perak hockey goalkeeper after Perak won against Johor in a hockey championship match. This incident marked the beginning of 1993 Constitutional Crisis.
1992	18 October	1993 Constitutional Crisis: Tunku Abdul Majid Idris was banned for 5 years from the game by the Malaysian Hockey Federation's disciplinary board after he was found guilty of assaulting the Perak goalkeeper during a hockey tournament in Johor Bahru last 10 July. This punishment made his father, Sultan Iskandar, angry and disappointed over his son's punishment.
1992	25 November	1993 Constitutional Crisis: In response to his son, Tunku Abdul Majid's punishment, Sultan Iskandar ordered the Johor education department to block the Johor hockey team from the hockey match just hours before the semi-final of a Malaysian Hockey Federation (MHF) tournament. This action disappointed Maktab Sultan Abu Bakar hockey coach Douglas Gomez and called on office bearers of the Johor Hockey Federation to resign.
1992	30 November	1993 Constitutional Crisis: Sultan Iskandar of Johor physically abused hockey coach Douglas Gomez at Istana Bukit Serene. This incident, known as the "Gomez Incident", received attention from local media and the Malaysian government.
1992	10 December	1993 Constitutional Crisis: A special parliamentary session was held immediately, saw all 96 members of the Dewan Rakyat present to pass a unanimous resolution to curb the powers of the rulers if necessary.
1992	27 December	1993 Constitutional Crisis: The subsequent parliamentary session saw discussions to remove legal immunity, which agitated Sultan Iskandar of Johor to hold a rally to oppose the government's actions, but was forced to cancel after intense government pressure.
1993	17 January	1993 Constitutional Crisis: 6 Sultans including Pahang, Terengganu, Perlis, Negeri Sembilan, Selangor, and Perak proposed amendments to remove legal immunity during the meeting at Istana Negara involving both Rulers and government. Johor, Kelantan, and Kedah were the only ones absent.
1993	18 January	1993 Constitutional Crisis: Prime Minister Mahathir Mohamad tabled the proposed amendments during parliamentary sessions in Dewan Rakyat on subsequent days despite Sultans' objections, citing as far to say that there was no need to obtain royal assent to implement laws.
1993	19 January	1993 Constitutional Crisis: 133 out of 180 MPs passed the proposed changes, although members of the opposition parties abstained from voting, citing indifferences. Dewan Negara passed a unanimous resolution to approve the proposed amendments the next day.
1993	31 March	1993 amendments to the Constitution of Malaysia: The Parliament passed amendments to the Constitution to strip the royalty of legal immunity. A new chapter, Part XV of the Constitution entitled "Proceedings against the Yang di-Pertuan Agong and the Rulers" was also enshrined.
1993	1 December	Dato Seri Anwar Ibrahim was appointed Deputy Prime Minister, replacing Tun Ghafar Baba.
1993	11 December	Block A of Highland Towers apartments suddenly collapsed at 1:35 PM in Hillview Park, Hulu Kelang, Selangor, leaving 48 people dead. Two people survived. This incident became the deadliest structural failure in Malaysian history.
1994	1 January	Petronas Towers construction commenced.
1995	29 June	20 people were killed in the landslide at Genting Highlands slip road near the Karak Highway.
1995	29 August	Putrajaya, the Federal Government's new administrative center project, was launched by Prime Minister Mahathir Mohamad.
1995	15 September	Malaysia Airlines Flight 2133, a Fokker 50 plane crashed near Tawau Airport in Tawau, Sabah, after a failed go-around, killing 34 people and 19 others survived
1996	12 January	MEASAT 1, the first Malaysian satellite, was launched by the Ariane rocket from Kourou, French Guiana, to provide satellite services to leading Malaysia broadcasters and communications through space.
1996	19 January	Riots and demonstrations by Vietnamese refugees took place in Sungai Besi transit camp, setting building blocks on fire. Police were deployed to ease the tense situation, leaving 24 Vietnamese and seven police officers injured.
1996	12 February	MSC Malaysia was founded as the Multimedia Super Corridor. The corridor area begins with Kuala Lumpur, passes through Cyberjaya and Putrajaya, and ends with Sepang, Selangor.
1996	1 June	ASTRO, Malaysia's first subscription-based satellite television station, was founded. It provides different channels.
1996	3 August	A widespread power outage in Peninsular Malaysia began at 5.17 pm on 3 August 1996 when a transmission line near Sultan Ismail Power Station in Paka, Terengganu tripped. The western states of Peninsular Malaysia lost power for several hours. Supply was back to normal the following day.
1996	29 August	A mud avalanche occurred near Pos Dipang Orang Asli settlement in Kampar, Perak, and killed 44 people.
1996	1 October	Kuala Lumpur Tower, Malaysia's tallest telecommunication tower, was officially opened.
1996	26 December	Tropical Depression Greg hit 9 Sabah states, including Kota Kinabalu, killing 238 people. One of the worst hurricane disasters in Malaysian history.
1997	17 May	Cyberjaya, Malaysia's city with a science park as the core that forms a key part of the Multimedia Super Corridor, was officially launched by then Prime Minister Mahathir Mohamad.
1997	23 May	M. Magendran (11.55 am) and N. Mohanadas (12.10 pm) made their history as the first Malaysians to reach the peak of Mount Everest, the Earth's highest mountain.
1997	7 July	1997 Asian financial crisis: Speculators heavily traded the Malaysian ringgit within days of the Thai baht devaluation. The overnight rate jumped from under 8% to over 40%. This led to rating downgrades and a general sell-off in the stock and currency markets.
1997	8 July	1997 Asian financial crisis: Malaysia's central bank intervened to defend its ringgit currency.
1997	21 July	1997 Asian financial crisis: The Kuala Lumpur Stock Exchange (KLSE) Composite Index fell below 200 points.
1997	24 July	1997 Asian financial crisis: Prime Minister Mahathir Mohamad accused "rogue speculators" for Southeast Asia's economic upheaval and blamed billionaire financier George Soros as the cause of the crisis.
1998	7 January	1997 Asian financial crisis: The ringgit depreciated against the dollar by almost 50 percent, hitting a high of RM 4.88 to the US dollar at its lowest point.
1998	23 January	1997 Asian financial crisis: The Ringgit had lost 50% of its value, falling from above 2.50 to under 4.57 to the US dollar
1998	7 April	NTV7, Malaysia's new channel, was officially launched.
1998	8 May	Suria KLCC shopping mall was officially opened at the foot of the Petronas Twin Towers.
1998	27 June	Kuala Lumpur International Airport (KLIA), Malaysia's new main international airport, was officially opened by then Agong, Tuanku Jaafar, in Sepang, Selangor.
1998	11 July	The National Sports Complex was officially inaugurated by the Prime Minister of Malaysia, Mahathir Mohamad in Bukit Jalil, Kuala Lumpur, ahead of the 16th Commonwealth Games.
1998	17 August	Petronas Philharmonic Hall, Malaysia's first concert hall built specifically for classical music, was officially opened at Petronas Twin Towers, Kuala Lumpur.
1998	1 September	1997 Asian financial crisis: Prime Minister Mahathir Mohamad imposed strict capital controls and introduced a 3.80 peg against the U.S. dollar.
1998	2 September	Deputy Prime Minister Anwar Ibrahim was sacked by Prime Minister Mahathir Mohamad. This is the beginning of Reformasi movement in Malaysian politics.
1998	11 - 21 September	The opening ceremony of the 1998 Commonwealth Games was held in Kuala Lumpur at National Stadium at Bukit Jalil, Kuala Lumpur for the first time. During the Games, the Malaysian contingent team won 10 gold medals, 14 silver and 12 bronze.
1998	20 September	Anwar Ibrahim was arrested by police at the house at night after a street demonstration in Kuala Lumpur, which demanded Mahathir resign as Prime Minister. He was detained under ISA 1960 the next day.
1998	29 September	Anwar Ibrahim was on trial for nine charges, including five from corruption and four from sodomy, at the Kuala Lumpur Session Court.
1999	7 January	Tan Sri Abdul Rahim Noor resigned as the Inspector General of Police after taking full responsibility for injuries suffered by former Deputy Prime Minister Anwar Ibrahim while in police custody last September 1998.
1999	8 January	Abdullah Ahmad Badawi was appointed as Deputy Prime Minister
1999	7 March	Sepang International Circuit, Malaysia's largest motorsport race track, was officially opened.
1999	1 April	The new Prime Ministerial office, Perdana Putra, was officially inaugurated in Putrajaya. The office was moved out from Kuala Lumpur to Putrajaya.
1999	4 April	Wan Azizah Wan Ismail, the wife of former Deputy Prime Minister Anwar Ibrahim, founded Parti Keadilan Rakyat (PKR).
1999	14 April	Anwar Ibrahim was found guilty by the High Court for corruption charges and was sentenced to 6 years in jail.
1999	31 August	Petronas Twin Towers, the world's tallest building, was officially opened by Prime Minister Mahathir Mohamad.
2000	23 April	2000 Sipadan kidnappings: 21 hostages were kidnapped by six Abu Sayyaf militants from a dive resort on the island of Sipadan, Sabah, and taken to the Abu Sayyaf base in Jolo, Sulu, in the southern Philippines.
2000	2 - 6 July	Al-Ma'unah, a Malaysian spiritual Islamist militant group, carried out an arms heist by stealing weapons from army camps at midnight and later hiding at the top of Jenalik Hill in Sauk, Kuala Kangsar, Perak. The group also took three hostages. Five days later, the Al-Ma'unah militants were defeated when Malaysian security forces stormed their camp on the hill, resulting in the deaths of 2 security personnel. At the same time, a police officer and a civilian hostage were rescued.
2000	8 August	Anwar Ibrahim was sentenced to 9 years in prison by the High Court on charges of sodomy.
2000	December	Gunung Mulu National Park and Kinabalu Park were designated as UNESCO World Heritage Sites for their natural significance.

== 21st century ==
Year	Date	Event
2001	1 February	Putrajaya was declared the third Federal Territory.
2001	16 April	Kuala Lumpur Sentral Station, also known as KL Sentral, the largest transit-oriented railway station housing various modes of transportation, was officially opened, replacing the old Kuala Lumpur railway station.
2001	5 September	The Malaysian identity card, also known as MyKad, a multipurpose card introduced by the Malaysian government, was launched.
2001	8 September	The opening ceremony of the 2001 SEA Games was held at the National Stadium in Bukit Jalil, Kuala Lumpur.
2001	11 September	The September 11 attacks occurred in New York City, USA, claiming the lives of 2,996 people, including 3 Malaysians.
2002	22 June	At the 2002 UMNO General Assembly, Mahathir Mohamad shocked the nation by announcing his resignation as Prime Minister, UMNO President, and BN Chairman. This prompted his supporters to rush to calm him down and tearfully convince him to reconsider his decision on stage. Shortly after, it was decided that the handover would occur in October 2003.
2003	11 February	Telekom Tower was officially opened.
2003	23 February	More than 200,000 Malaysians gathered at the National Stadium in Bukit Jalil to support the "Malaysians For Peace" movement.
2003	31 October	Mahathir Mohamad resigned after 22 years of leadership, and Abdullah Ahmad Badawi was sworn in as Malaysia's fifth Prime Minister the following day.
2003	12 December	Penang and Malacca City were designated as UNESCO World Heritage Sites, recognized as the Historic Cities of the Straits of Malacca.
2004	7 January	Najib Razak was appointed Deputy Prime Minister.
2004	8 January	8TV, a Malaysian Chinese television channel, was launched.
2004	21 March	Barisan Nasional won 198 out of 219 parliamentary seats in the 2004 general election, setting a record for its most significant majority victory.
2004	2 September	Anwar Ibrahim was released after the Federal Court overturned his conviction and set aside his prison sentence on charges of sodomy.
2004	26 December	A tsunami struck many parts of Asia, including Malaysia, affecting the northern regions of Peninsular Malaysia, such as Penang and Langkawi. The disaster left 67 people dead.
2005	20 October	Tun Endon Mahmood Ambak, the wife of Prime Minister Abdullah Ahmad Badawi, died at the age of 64 after a prolonged battle with breast cancer.
2005	9 November	Azahari Husin, also known as "Demolition Man", a Malaysian engineer and former university lecturer believed to be the technical mastermind behind several major terrorist bombings in Indonesia, including the 2002 Bali bombings, was killed during a police raid on his hideout in Batu, East Java, Indonesia.
2006	22 April	TV9, a new Malaysian television channel, was launched.
2007	31 August	Malaysia celebrated its 50th anniversary of independence.
2007	10 October	Dr Sheikh Muszaphar Shukor became the first Malaysian astronaut to fly up to the International Space Station (ISS) with American and Russian astronauts using the Soyuz TMA-11 rocket from Kazakhstan.
2007	10 November	The first Bersih rally was held in Kuala Lumpur in their demand against corruption in the electoral process in Malaysia.
2007	25 November	More than 30,000 Hindu Rights Action Force supporters participated in a 2007 HINDRAF rally, which was held in Kuala Lumpur in their demand against Malaysian Indian discrimination.
2008	8 March	Barisan Nasional won the election but suffered its worst results since the 1969 election, losing its two-thirds majority. The opposition captured Kedah, Penang, Perak, and Selangor from BN, while PAS retained Kelantan.
2008	1 April	A new opposition coalition, Pakatan Rakyat, was formed by PKR, DAP, and PAS.
2008	19 May	Tun Dr Mahathir Mohamad left UMNO, forcing Abdullah Ahmad Badawi to step down as Prime Minister.
2008	29 June	Anwar Ibrahim sought refuge in the Turkish embassy in Kuala Lumpur for his safety. He left the embassy the next day.
2008	16 July	Anwar Ibrahim was arrested again by police in Kuala Lumpur shortly after the Anti-Corruption Agency (ACA) interview. It is believed that police purposely wanted a DNA sample from Anwar at the hospital due to reports of his sodomising his aide.
2008	7 August	Anwar Ibrahim pleaded not guilty to sodomy charges, freed on RM 20,000 bond at Kuala Lumpur Court Sessions.
2008	26 August	Anwar Ibrahim won the Permatang Pauh by-election, marking his return to Parliament after 10 years. He was also appointed as Opposition Leader 2 days later.
2008	12 September	Malaysia Today news portal editor Raja Petra Kamaruddin, Seputeh MP Teresa Kok, and Sin Chew Daily News reporter Tan Hoon Cheng were arrested under ISA 1960. Hoon Cheng was freed the next day.
2008	14 September	De facto law minister Zaid Ibrahim led a chorus of protests with six ministers against the use of ISA 1960 and demanded that the government review the Act.
2008	17 September	Abdullah and his deputy, Najib Tun Razak, swapped their portfolios, with Abdullah as Defence Minister and Najib as Finance Minister
2009	31 January	2 PKR Perak State Assembly members went missing, and 1 DAP State Assembly also went missing 2 days later. It was believed that they would defect to the opposition party, BN, thus marking the beginning of the Perak political crisis.
2009	4 February	Deputy Prime Minister Najib Tun Razak declared that the BN government has enough of a majority to form a government in Perak due to the defection of three Perak state assembly members. This marked the collapse of the Pakatan Rakyat government in Perak since GE12 in 2008.
2009	6 February	Zambry Abdul Kadir was sworn in as Menteri Besar of Perak, but Nizar Jamaluddin vowed to stay despite Sultan Perak's call for his resignation.
2009	3 March	Perak Pakatan Rakyat state assembly members met under a tree after being barred from the building.
2009	3 April	Najib Tun Razak was sworn in as the sixth Prime Minister after Tun Abdullah Ahmad Badawi resigned.
2009	10 April	Muhyiddin Yassin was appointed as Deputy Prime Minister.
2009	11 May	High Court ruled that Nizar Jamaluddin was declared as legitimate Menteri Besar. BN filed its appeal against this decision.
2009	21 May	Appeal Court decided that Zambry Abdul Kadir was declared the rightful Menteri Besar. Nizar Jamaluddin filed an appeal against this decision.
2010	9 February	Federal Court ruled that Zambry Abdul Kadir is the rightful Menteri Besar after Nizar's appeal is rejected, ending the Perak political crisis.
2010	1 November	TV Al-Hijrah, Malaysia's first Islamic channel, was launched.
2010	29 December	The Malaysian football team won the first AFF Suzuki Cup after defeating Indonesia 4-2 on aggregate.
2011	9 July	Bersih 2.0 rally was held in the streets of Kuala Lumpur.
2011	15 September	Prime Minister Najib Razak announced the proposed repeal of the Internal Security Act 1960 (ISA) when he claimed that the repeal was required to accommodate and realise a mature, modern, and functioning democracy, preserve public order, enhance civil liberty, and maintain racial harmony.
2011	15 November	The New Istana Negara building, the house of Yang Di-Pertuan Agong in Jalan Duta, was officially opened by the then-Agong, Tuanku Mizan Zainal Abidin. Later, the house was moved from the old palace to it.
2011	21 November	The Malaysian football team won the gold medal after beating Indonesia 4-3 in a penalty shootout after being tied 1-1 at full time at the 2011 SEA Games football men's final in Indonesia.
2011	13 December	Sultan Abdul Halim Muadzam Shah of Kedah was elected as the country's 14th Yang di-Pertuan Agong for the second time. Sultan Muhammad V of Kelantan was elected as the Deputy Yang di-Pertuan Agong.
2012	9 January	Anwar Ibrahim was acquitted of sodomy charges by the Kuala Lumpur High Court. During that time, three explosive devices detonated in the middle of Anwar's supporters.
2012	28 April	Bersih 3.0 rally was held.
2012	9 May	Parliament passed the Security Offences (Special Measures) Act 2012, also known as SOSMA. This controversial law replaced and repealed ISA 1960 and became effective on 31 July.
2012	6 July	Lenggong became a cultural UNESCO World Heritage Site.
2013	11 February	2013 Lahad Datu standoff: Sulu Militants arrived on the beach quietly in Lahad Datu, Sabah. Due to this, negotiations started between the Malaysian government and Sulu militants to resolve the intrusion.
2013	1 March	2013 Lahad Datu standoff: First shootout between the sultanate's forces and the police at the Tanduo village occurred, leaving two police officers and 12 of the sultanate's men killed.
2013	3 March	2013 Lahad Datu standoff: An ambush at Semporna killed six police officers and six terrorists.
2013	5 March	2013 Lahad Datu standoff: Military and police began mopping-up operations codenamed "Ops Daulat".
2013	5 May	Election was held. The results showed that BN had won, but the Opposition had popular votes for the first time. Despite that, BN has taken Kedah from the Opposition.
2014	27 January	Kajang Move: The attempted replacement of Khalid Ibrahim as Menteri Besar (Chief Minister) of Selangor with Anwar Ibrahim started a political crisis.
2014	8 March	Malaysia Airlines Flight 370, which carried 227 passengers and 12 crew members, disappeared near the Vietnamese sea border after take-off from KLIA. Search and rescue were activated to find the missing plane.
2014	24 March	Prime Minister, Najib Razak, announced that Flight MH370 ended in the southern Indian Ocean.
2014	17 July	Malaysia Airlines Flight 17 was shot down by a missile in Donetsk, Ukraine, near the Russian border after take-off from Amsterdam, Netherlands, killing all 283 passengers and 15 crew members aboard. 43 were Malaysian
2014	22 August	The bodies of 20 Malaysians killed in the MH17 incident arrived in KLIA, Sepang, Selangor, with a somber ceremony broadcast live on radio and television during National Mourning Day.
2014	23 September	Kajang Move: The crisis concluded with the appointment of Parti KeADILan Rakyat Deputy President, Azmin Ali, as Menteri Besar.
2014	15 December - 3 January 2015	2014–2015 Malaysia floods affected Johor, Kedah, Kelantan, Negeri Sembilan, Pahang, Perak, Perlis, Sabah, Sarawak, Selangor and Terengganu causing more than 500,000 people to be affected with 21 people killed. This was the worst flood disaster in decades.
2015	10 February	Anwar Ibrahim was sentenced to 5 years in prison by the Federal Court for the charge of sodomy against his aide, Saiful Bukhari Azlan, in 2008.
2015	1 April	The Goods and Services Tax (GST), Malaysia's government value-added tax, was implemented with a standard rate of 6%.
2015	5 June	Sabah earthquake struck Ranau, Sabah, and surrounding areas, causing 137 climbers to be stranded on Mount Kinabalu but were subsequently rescued later. As a result, 18 people died, including 10 Singaporeans, two from both China and Japan, on the same mountain.
2015	16 June	Pakatan Rakyat was declared dissolved after PAS left the coalition party, citing the unavoidable differences between PAS and DAP.
2015	2 July	The Wall Street Journal (WSJ) released a report alleging US$700 million (RM 2.6 billion) of deposits suspected to have originated with 1MDB have flowed into Najib Razak's personal bank accounts.
2015	29 July	Ahmad Zahid Hamidi was appointed Deputy Prime Minister, replacing Muhyiddin Yassin for criticizing Najib Tun Razak due to the 1MDB scandal.
2015	29 - 30 August	Bersih 4.0 rally was held with surprisingly Tun Dr Mahathir and his wife, who attended the rally, urging Najib Tun Razak to resign as Prime Minister.
2015	22 September	Pakatan Harapan (PH), the new Opposition coalition party that replaced Pakatan Rakyat, was formed.
2016	3 February	Mukhriz Mahathir, the son of Tun Dr Mahathir, resigned as Kedah Menteri Besar after he lost the majority of support among the assemblymen due to his criticism towards Najib Tun Razak over the 1MDB scandal.
2016	29 February	Tun Dr Mahathir Mohamad left UMNO again, for the second time demanding Najib Tun Razak resign as Prime Minister
2016	4 March	Tun Dr Mahathir Mohamad launched a Malaysian Citizens' Declaration with cooperation from opposition parties to demand Najib Tun Razak's resignation as Prime Minister.
2016	24 June	UMNO Deputy President Tan Sri Muhyiddin Yassin and UMNO Kedah leader Mukhriz Mahathir were sacked from the party due to their cooperation with other opposition parties demanding Najib Tun Razak resign. Meanwhile, UMNO Vice President Shafie Apdal was suspended due to his criticism of Najib Tun Razak's leadership but left UMNO several days later.
2016	21 July	The United States Department of Justice filed a civil suit to seize assets. The 1Malaysia Development Berhad scandal alleged the assets were bought with funds stolen from 1MDB. The suit said $681m found its way into the personal account of ‘Malaysian Official 1’, later identified as Najib by both the US and a Malaysian minister.
2016	10 August	Tun Dr Mahathir founded his new party, Parti Pribumi Bersatu Malaysia, or BERSATU, with former UMNO leaders Muhyiddin Yassin and Mukhriz Mahathir, in opposition to the then-prime minister, Najib Tun Razak.
2016	17 October	Former UMNO Vice President Shafie Apdal formed a new Sabah party, Parti Warisan Sabah or WARISAN.
2016	19 November	Bersih 5.0 rally was held.
2017	13 February	Kim Jong-nam, eldest son of North Korean leader Kim Jong II was murdered after he was grabbed and his face smeared with VX nerve agent at Kuala Lumpur International Airport.
2017	15 February	A Vietnamese, Doan Thi Huong, was detained at the KLIA terminal where Kim was killed. An Indonesian, Siti Aisyah, was also detained the next day. They later claimed they were framed when they were hired to trick him as part of a so-called funny television show at the terminal.
2017	16 February	Police arrested North Korean Ri Jong-Chol, who is believed to be a chemical expert over Kim Jong Nam's death, but he was later released due to lack of evidence and deported from the country.
2017	17 February	Police announced they were looking for 7 North Korean suspects in connection with the Kim Jong Nam murder. Police later said 4 of them were believed to have left the country and sought Interpol's help to detain them.
2017	4 March	The Malaysian government expelled North Korean Ambassador Kang Chol after he denounced Malaysia's investigations into Kim Jong Nam's murder and accused Kuala Lumpur of colluding with outside forces to defame Pyongyang. He was also given 48 hours to clear the embassy and leave the country.
2017	7 March	In response to expelling the North Korean Ambassador, the North Korean government banned Malaysian citizens from leaving the country as tension escalated over Kim's killing. Malaysia responded with a similar ban soon after.
2017	19 - 30 August	2017 SEA Games were held in the National Stadium Bukit Jalil, Kuala Lumpur. Malaysia received the number 1 ranking with 145 gold medals, 90 silver, and 86 bronze medals.
2017	14 September	23 people, most of them students, were killed in a fire that broke out at Darul Quran Ittifaqiyah, a tahfiz (religious) school in Datuk Keramat, Kuala Lumpur. This tragedy was allegedly an act of arson caused by drug addicts. As a result, seven suspects were arrested.
2018	9 May	Pakatan Harapan, led by Tun Dr Mahathir Mohamad, won the 14th General Election (GE14), defeating Barisan Nasional , which was led by Prime Minister Najib Tun Razak after 61 years of BN ruling, marking the first change of government coalition since Independence.
2018	10 May	Tun Dr Mahathir Mohamad was sworn in as the seventh Prime Minister for the second time. He was the world's oldest leader to become Prime Minister at 93.
2018		A Sabah party, United Progressive Kinabalu Organisation (UPKO), left the BN party coalition.
2018	11 May	Two Sabah parties, PBRS and LDP, also left the BN party coalition.
2018	12 May	Former Prime Minister Najib Tun Razak and his wife Rosmah Mansor were barred from leaving Malaysia.
2018	12 May	Former Prime Minister Najib Tun Razak stepped down as UMNO President and BN chairman due to BN's loss in GE14.
2018		Sabah party, United Sabah Party, left the BN coalition government.
2018	16 May	Anwar Ibrahim was freed from prison after being given a royal pardon by then Agong, Muhammad V of Kelantan.
2018	21 May	Anwar's wife, Wan Azizah Wan Ismail, was appointed Deputy Prime Minister. She became the first woman to be Deputy Prime Minister in history.
2018	1 June	GST rate reduced from 6% to 0% as the Pakatan Harapan government promised.
2018	11 June	4 Sarawak main parties, PBB, PRS, PDP, and SUPP, left the BN coalition to form Gabungan Parti Sarawak (GPS)
2018	23 June	GERAKAN left the BN coalition.
2018	3 July	Najib Tun Razak was arrested by the Malaysian Anti-Corruption Commission (MACC). He was charged with four counts of CBT and abuse of power over RM 42 million, which was transferred into his private account from SRC International the following day.
2018	1 September	Sales and Service Tax (SST) was introduced, replacing GST.
2018	26 - 27 November	The Sri Maha Mariamman Temple riot, which took place for two days at the temple site in Subang Jaya, Selangor, originated from a disagreement between the temple and One City Development Sdn. Bhd., concerning the transfer of the temple. This led to property damage, widespread media coverage, and the death of firefighter Muhammad Adib bin Mohd Kassim, who died 21 days after the second day of the riot.
2018	8 December	The 2018 anti-ICERD rally was organised by opposition right-wing political parties PAS and UMNO, with the support of various non-governmental organisations in response to the PH government plan to ratify the United Nations convention known as ICERD.
2019	6 January	Sultan Muhammad V of Kelantan stepped down as Yang Di-Pertuan Agong, marking that he was the first King of Malaysia to resign in history.
2019	24 January	Sultan Abdullah of Pahang was declared the next Yang-Di Pertuan Agong after the decision was made in the Rulers Conference at Istana Negara.
2019	14 September	A New Malaysian coalition party, Muafakat Nasional, was formed due to cooperation between UMNO and PAS against Pakatan Harapan.
2020	25 January	The first cases of novel coronavirus (COVID-19) were detected in Malaysia among travelers from China in Johor.
2020	4 February	First Malaysian tested positive for COVID-19.
2020	23 February	Several political leaders went to Istana Negara to grant an audience with Agong Sultan Abdullah to purposely seek a change of government.
2020		Several Members of Parliament, including government and opposition, attended the dinner at the Sheraton Hotel, marking the beginning of political events known as the "Sheraton Move."
2020	24 February	Mahathir Mohamad resigned as the seventh Prime Minister of Malaysia due to the country's political crisis.
2020		BERSATU left the Pakatan Harapan coalition.
2020		PKR Deputy President Azmin Ali and Vice President Zuraida Kamaruddin were sacked for betraying Pakatan Harapan. Eight other Members of Parliament who aligned with Azmin's camp left PKR.
2020		The Pakatan Harapan government automatically fell after 22 months of ruling since GE14 in 2018.
2020		Yang di-Pertuan Agong, Sultan Abdullah appointed Tun Dr Mahathir Mohamad as interim Prime Minister to serve until a Prime Minister could be chosen.
2020	25 February	Istana Negara announced that the Agong interview session was held to collect statements from all Members of Parliament on choosing a Prime Minister.
2020	26 February	Sultan Johor ordered all 56 members of the State Assembly to meet at Johor palace due to a hung state assembly, which is believed to have occurred after BERSATU left the Pakatan Harapan coalition.
2020		The Hung Melaka State Assembly occurred after BERSATU left PH, causing Melaka Chief Minister Adly Zahari to brief Melaka Yang-Di Pertuan Negeri about the political situation in the state.
2020	27 February	Johor Palace announced that BN, BERSATU, and PAS, a new coalition party, would lead the government, thus ending PH leadership for the Johor government.
2020		Hung Perak State Assembly occurred after BERSATU left PH, causing BN Perak to inform Perak Sultan about the political situation in the state.
2020		Kedah Menteri Besar Mukhriz Mahathir stated that the PH Kedah government remained despite the ongoing political crisis at the federal level.
2020	28 February	BERSATU announced that it, supported by BN and PAS, would choose Muhyiddin Yassin as its prime ministerial candidate.
2020		Hasni Mohammad from UMNO, was sworn in as the new Johor Menteri Besar in front of the Sultan at Istana Bukit Serene, Johor Bahru.
2020	29 February	Pakatan Harapan announced that Tun Dr. Mahathir Mohamad had been chosen as the Prime Minister candidate after discovering that BN, BERSATU, and PASa supported Muhyiddin Yassin.
2020		BERSATU president, Muhyiddin with the support of BN and PAS, was granted an audience with Agong to form a new government with a new coalition party, Perikatan Nasional.
2020		The Rulers Conference decided that Muhyiddin had enough support from the majority to become the new prime minister.
2020	1 March	Tan Sri Muhyiddin Yassin was appointed as eighth Prime Minister.
2020	2 March	BN Melaka declared that the PH Melaka government collapsed due to BERSATU and some PH State Assembly members' defection to BN, thus automatically sacked Adly Zahari as Melaka Chief Minister after he lost enough majority.
2020	9 March	Sulaiman Md Ali from UMNO was sworn in as the new Melaka Chief Minister.
2020		Perak Menteri Besar, Ahmad Faizal Azumu announced that a new coalition party would lead the Perak government, ending PH leadership for the Perak government. Faizal has resigned as Perak Menteri Besar the next day.
2020		Ahmad Faizal Azumu from BERSATU was reappointed as Perak Menteri Besar.
2020	16 March	Due to health concerns over the recent spike in new COVID-19 cases, Prime Minister Muhyiddin Yassin announced a nationwide lockdown, known as the lockdown, also known as the Movement Control Order (MCO). Several major roads were blocked, the nation's border was closed, and places such as offices, shops, schools, mosques, etc. were crowded.
2020	17 March	The first 2 Malaysian deaths from the COVID-19 pandemic were reported.
2020	18 March	Movement Control Order (MCO) lockdown was imposed in response to the emerging COVID-19 pandemic in Malaysia.
2020	25 March	The MCO lockdown was extended from 1 April to 14 April due to a continuous spike in new COVID-19 cases.
2020	12 May	Kedah Opposition party announced that the Pakatan Harapan government collapsed due to PKR defection to Perikatan Nasional, but Mukhriz Mahathir vowed to stay on despite the announcement.
2020	17 May	Mukhriz Mahathir resigned as Menteri Besar of Kedah after losing confidence in the Kedah State Assembly. That same day, Sanusi Md Nor was sworn in as the new Kedah Menteri Besar.
2020	18 May	In a royal address during a Parliament sitting, Agong called on all politicians not to drag the country into any further political crisis, as Malaysia was already experiencing a COVID-19 pandemic.
2020	28 May	BERSATU chairman, Tun Dr. Mahathir Mohamad, Mukhriz Mahathir, Syed Saddiq Abdul Rahman, Maszlee Malik, and Amiruddin Hamzah were expelled from the party.
2020	28 July	The High Court convicted former prime minister Najib Razak on all seven counts of abuse of power, money laundering and criminal breach of trust, becoming the first Prime Minister of Malaysia to be convicted of corruption, and was sentenced to 12 years imprisonment and fined RM210 million.
2020	29 July	Former Sabah Chief Minister Musa Aman announced the collapse of the WARISAN government and the formation of the Perikatan Nasional government.
2020	30 July	In response to the previous day's announcement, Sabah Chief Minister Shafie Apdal announced the dissolution of the Sabah State Assembly, causing a state snap election.
2020	23 September	Anwar Ibrahim announced that PH claimed enough majority support to become the Malaysian government. That same day, Prime Minister Muhyiddin Yassin dismissed Anwar's claim and stated that the Perikatan Nasional government remained.
2020	26 September	2020 Sabah state election was held, resulting in a new Sabah coalition party, Gabungan Rakyat Sabah (GRS), winning a thin majority with 38 seats, followed by the rival coalition party, WARISAN, with 32 seats.
2020	23 October	Prime Minister Muhyiddin Yassin granted an audience with Agong to discuss declaring a State of Emergency to ease the political situation in Malaysia during the COVID-19 pandemic.
2021	12 January	The 2021 Malaysian state of emergency was declared with the approval of the government's request by Agong under Article 150 of the Malaysian Constitution to ease tense politics in containing the COVID-19 pandemic effectively from 12 January 2021 to 1 August 2021.
2021	18 February	High Court ordered Rosmah Mansor, the wife of former Prime Minister Najib Razak, to enter defense on all three graft charges.
2021	21 February	The first shipment of the Pfizer-BioNTech COVID-19 vaccine officially arrived at KLIA Cargo after months of anticipation, with the implementation of the National COVID-19 Immunisation Programme set to begin in phases starting February 26.
2021	24 February	Prime Minister Muhyiddin Yassin became the first person in Malaysia to receive a COVID-19 vaccine shot as the country rolled out its nationwide vaccination campaign two days earlier than scheduled.
2021	28 May	The Kelana Jaya LRT collision occurred on the Kelana Jaya line between Kampung Baru and KLCC stations in Kuala Lumpur, causing 213 people to be injured.
2021	15 June	National Recovery Plan (NRP), an implementation plan consisting of 4 phases to revive the Malaysian economy, which had been adversely affected by the COVID-19 pandemic, was introduced.
2021	16 June	The King of Sultan Abdullah announced that Parliament would convene as soon as possible to address several issues related to COVID-19 in Malaysia.
2021	5 July	The King of Sultan Abdullah, with the agreement of the Malaysian government, allowed Parliament to be held on 26 July before the Emergency, which ended in August.
2021	7 July	Ismail Sabri Yaakob was appointed Deputy Prime Minister.
2021	8 July	UMNO President Ahmad Zahid Hamidi announced withdrawing support for Muhyiddin and the Perikatan Nasional government immediately because some UMNO conditions to the Perikatan Nasional government were not fulfilled.
2021	26 July	Parliament meeting was opened in the middle of the COVID-19 crisis in Malaysia.
2021	29 July	The King of Sultan Abdullah was very disappointed that the Parliament had not approved the cancellation of the Emergency Ordinance.
2021	3 August	UMNO President Ahmad Zahid Hamidi announced that UMNO withdrew its support for Muhyiddin Yassin as Prime Minister along with 10 other UMNO Members of Parliament for his government's failure to the King of Malaysia and in tackling the COVID-19 crisis in Malaysia.
2021	4 August	Prime Minister Muhyiddin Yassin announced that he would remain Prime Minister with the support of Perikatan Nasional, UMNO, GPS, GRS, and others. Thus, he would call for a vote of confidence in September.
2021	6 August	Deputy Prime Minister Ismail Sabri Yaakob announced that 31 Barisan Nasional Members of Parliament would support Muhyiddin Yassin as Prime Minister and the Perikatan Nasional government.
2021	16 August	Muhyiddin Yassin announced his resignation as Prime Minister thus his cabinet automatically resigned as well. He remained as caretaker prime minister until Ismail Sabri Yaakob was appointed PM.
2021	21 August	Ismail Sabri Yaakob was sworn in as the ninth Prime Minister.
2021	20 November	A snap election was held in Melaka and resulted in the Barisan Nasional (BN) winning most of the seats to form the Melaka government.
2021	8 December	The Court of Appeal upheld the conviction and sentence of former prime minister Najib Razak.
2021	18 December	Sarawak state election was held, resulting in Gabungan Parti Sarawak (GPS) winning most of the seats to form the Sarawak government.
2022	12 March	A snap election was held in Johor, resulting in Barisan Nasional (BN) winning most of the seats to form the Johor government.
2022	23 August	The Federal Court of Malaysia upheld Najib Razak's conviction. The same day, he began his 12-year sentence in Kajang Prison. However, he continues to attend trials related to other corruption cases.
2022	19 November	The 15th Malaysian general election (GE15) showed that Pakatan Harapan had won 82 seats followed by 74 seats for Perikatan Nasional and 30 for Barisan Nasional, producing a hung parliament. None of the party coalitions reached the 112-seat majority required to form a government.
2022	24 November	Anwar Ibrahim was appointed as the tenth Prime Minister after a decision by the Rulers Conference in Istana Negara. He led the country with a unity government consisting of PH, BN, GPS, WARISAN, and other Independents. This event marked the end of 24 years of waiting for the Prime Ministership since spearheading the Reformasi movement in 1998.
2022	3 December	Ahmad Zahid Hamidi was sworn in as Deputy Prime Minister for the second time while Fadillah Yusof was sworn in as Deputy Prime Minister II, making them the first two Deputy Prime Ministers in Malaysian history.
2022	16 December	The Batang Kali Landslide struck three sections, including some tents from Father's Organic Farm in Batang Kali, Selangor, killing 31 people; 61 people survived the disaster.
2023	27 January	UMNO sacked Khairy Jamaluddin and Noh Omar from the party and also suspended Hishamuddin Tun Hussein and three other UMNO leaders for violating the party's Constitution by helping a rival coalition party to win in the last GE15.
2023	12 March	Malaysian actress, Michelle Yeoh won the Best Actress Oscar for the 2022 American film, Everything Everywhere All at Once at the 95th Academy Awards, marking the first Malaysian to achieve this award.
2023	17 August	A Beechcraft 390 Premier I business jet carrying passengers, including Johari Harun, a member of the Pahang State Executive Council and the Pahang State Legislative Assembly representative for Pelangai, crashed onto an expressway interchange near Elmina in Sungai Buloh, Selangor, Malaysia, resulting in the deaths of 10 people.
2024	10 January	Merdeka 118 was officially opened by Yang di-Pertuan Agong Al-Sultan Abdullah Ri’ayatuddin Al-Mustafa Billah Shah and Raja Permaisuri Agong Tunku Azizah Aminah Maimunah Iskandariah.
2024	23 April	Two Royal Malaysian Navy helicopters collided over the town of Lumut during a military parade rehearsal celebrating the 90th anniversary of the Royal Malaysian Navy. Killing all 10 people on board the aircraft.
2024	17 May	The 2024 Ulu Tiram police station attack, which occurred in Johor, Malaysia, resulted in the deaths of 2 police officers, injuries to another, and the fatal shooting of the sole attacker. He was initially suspected of ties to Jemaah Islamiyah (JI) due to his father's connection with the group but was later confirmed to have acted alone.
2024	24 October	Economy Minister Rafizi Ramli represented Malaysia at the 16th BRICS Summit.
2025	1 January	Malaysia formally attained BRICS partner-country status, strengthening its economic and trade ties with BRICS nations.
2025	1 April	A major Petronas gas pipeline leak in Putra Heights, Subang Jaya, Selangor triggered a massive explosion and fire that injured around 150 people (including burns and smoke inhalation), damaged hundreds of homes and vehicles, and displaced over 500 residents. No fatalities were reported.
2025	14 April	Former Prime Minister Abdullah Ahmad Badawi, Malaysia's fifth Prime Minister, died at the age of 85.
2025	10 July	Former Prime Minister Mahathir Mohamad celebrated his 100th birthday, becoming the first Malaysian national leader to reach that age.
2025	26 October	The 47th ASEAN Summit was held in Kuala Lumpur. Cambodia and Thailand signed the Kuala Lumpur Peace Accord, ending the 2025 Cambodia–Thailand conflict. Timor-Leste officially joined ASEAN.
2025	26 November	The 2025 Sabah state election was held; Gabungan Rakyat Sabah and WARISAN performed strongly while the federal coalition parties suffered losses.
2025	26 December	The High Court convicted former Prime Minister Najib Razak in the largest trial related to the 1MDB scandal, sentencing him to an additional 15 years' imprisonment and a fine of RM13.5 billion for abuse of power and money laundering.
2026	5 January	Prime Minister Anwar Ibrahim announced major institutional reform bills, including a two-term (maximum 10-year) limit for the Prime Minister.
2026	24 January	Barisan Nasional won both the Kinabatangan and Lamag by-elections with large majorities.

== See also ==
- Timeline of the 1Malaysia Development Berhad scandal
