= Family tree of Kelantanese monarchs =

The following is the family tree of the Malay monarchs of Kelantan. While foreign sources include oblique references to the successive rulers who governed the city states of ancient Kelantan, a clear genealogy only emerges with Mansur Shah who reigned from 1465 to 1526. His father, Iskandar Shah is said to have been descendant of the ruler of the similarly obscure Kota Gelanggi.

== House of Iskandar ==
References to Kelantan in the Malay Annals allude to a well-established sultanate in the 15th century with its power rivalling that of neighbouring Patani. It identifies Kelantan's line of rulers as descending from Raja Chulan, the ruler of Kota Gelanggi. Towards the end of the 15th century, during the reign of Sultan Mansur, Kelantan was conquered by Melaka, but he was restored to the throne shortly afterwards as Kelantan became the vassal of Melaka until 1511. A prince of Melaka dynasty from Johor, Raja Hussin ruled the Sultanate from 1580 to 1610 in the place of the younger Siti Wan Kembang, the daughter of Sultan Ahmad, who would become the legendary female ruler of the Sultanate.

Siti Wan Kembang's rule coincided with the emergence of a small Jembal Sultanate in northeastern modern Kelantan. She later adopted the daughter of Raja Loyor, Jembal's second ruler. The subsequent abdication of Siti Wan Kembang in favour of this adopted child known as Puteri Saadong, who also inherited the throne of Jembal marked the union of the kingdoms of Kelantan and Jembal. Siti Wan Kembang was the last member of the line of rulers descended from Sultan Iskandar Shah.

– Rulers of Kelantan

House of Iskandar

Iskandar^{(1)} r. ?–1465
Mansur^{(2)} r. 1465–1526
Gombak^{(3)} r. 1526–1548	♀Onang; Kening	Mahmud; Melaka r. 1488–1511
♀a lady consort	Mansur; Pahang r. 1495–1519	♀Raja Dewi
Raja Ahmad	♀Raja; Puspa Dewi	Ahmad^{(4)} r. 1548–1580
Abdul Jalil II; Johor r. 1571–1597
Hussin^{(5)} r. 1510–1610	♀Siti Wan; Kembang^{(6)} r. 1610–1663

== House of Jembal ==
House of Jembal

Raja Sakti; Jembal^{(1)} r. 1637–1649
Raja Loyor; Jembal^{(2)} r. 1649–1663	Raja Bahar; Jembal^{(3)} r. 1663–1667	Umar^{(9)} r. 1675–1721	Wan Daim; Dato' Pengkalan; Pattani
♀Saadong^{(7)} r. 1663–1671	Raja Abdullah^{(7)} r. 1663–1671	Abdul Rahim^{(8)} r. 1671–1675	♀Raja Pah	Long Bahar^{(10)} r. 1721–1733
House of Long Yunus

== House of Long Yunus ==
Details on the origin of the House of Long Yunus is obscure, except that its progenitor, Wan Daim, was identified as a nobleman from Pattani, who had close relationship with Sultan Umar of Jembal. There are different accounts on the lineage of Wan Daim in various texts. According to Ringkasan Cetera Kelantan edited by Nik Mahmud, Wan Daim is thought to have descended from Andi or Andik Ali, a Bugis prince who migrated from Johor to Pattani in 1640. However, this view was refuted by the members of Kelantan Royal family. Another popular account came from Hikayat Seri Kelantan, that identified Wan Daim as a renegade Cham prince. While in a genealogy known as Salsilah Shaikh Safiuddin, Wan Daim is said to have descended from Shaikh Safiuddin, a nobleman of Pattani.

Following the power struggle which resulted in the murder of his father Long Sulaiman in 1756, Long Yunus fled to the neighboring Terengganu Sultanate, placing himself under the protection of its powerful ruler, Mansur Shah I. In 1763, Sultan Mansur launched first of a series of attack against Kelantan, successfully brought his protege Long Yunus to the throne of Kelantan 11 years later. Until the end of the 18th century, Kelantan remained under the overlordship of Terengganu. In spite of this, Long Yunus is regarded as the founder of the modern state of Kelantan, as he was credited for unifying the state and successfully brought all the warring chiefs under his control.

House of Long Yunus

House of Jembal	Wan Daim; Dato' Pengkalan; Pattani
♀Raja Pah	Long Bahar^{(10)} r. 1721–1733
Long Sulaiman^{(11)} r. 1734–1756
House of Terengganu	Long Yunus^{(12)} r. 1763–1795
Tengku; Muhammad^{(13)} r. 1795–1800	♀ Cik Ku; Tuan Nawi	Long Tan; Tengku; Temenggong	Muhammad I^{(14)} r. 1800–1837^{(2)}	Long Zainal^{(15)} r. 1837–1839
Muhammad II^{(16)} r. 1839–1877
Ahmad^{(17)} r. 1877–1890
Muhammad III^{(18)} r. 1890–1891	Mansur^{(19)} r. 1891–1899
Muhammad IV^{(20)} r. 1899–1920
Ismail^{(21)} r. 1920–1944	Ibrahim^{(22)} r. 1944–1960	Tengku Kembang Petri; Tengku Maharani Putri
Yahya Petra^{(23)} r. 1960–1979; YDP Agong VI r. 1975–1979	Raja Perempuan Zainab II; Raja Perempuan Kelantan r. 1960–1979; Raja Permaisuri Agong VI r. 1975–1979
Ismail Petra^{(24)} r. 1979–2010
Muhammad V^{(25)} r. 2010–present YDP Agong XV r. 2016–2019	Tengku Muhammad; Fakhry Petra; Tengku Mahkota; Kelantan

== Bibliography ==
- Ahmad Sarji Abdul Hamid (2011), The Encyclopedia of Malaysia, vol. 16 - The Rulers of Malaysia, Editions Didier Millet, ISBN 978-981-3018-54-9
- Abdullah Zakaria Ghazali; Zahir Ahmad (2007), Kelantan, dahulu dan sekarang ('Kelantan, then and now'), Museum Association of Malaysia
- Rogayah A. Hamid; Mariyam Salim (2006), Kesultanan Melayu Kelantan ('The Malay Sultanate of Kelantan'), Dewan Bahasa dan Pustaka, ISBN 978-983-6292-45-2
- Rentse, Anker (1934), "History of Kelantan I", Journal of the Malayan Branch of the Royal Asiatic Society, 12, Malaysian Branch of the Royal Asiatic Society
- Nik Hassan Shuhaimi bin Nik Abd Rahman (1987), Kelantan zaman awal : kajian arkeologi dan sejarah di Malaysia ('The early times of Kelantan: Archaeological research and history in Malaysia'), Perbadanan Muzim Negeri Kelantan
