= 1989 Taufiqiah Al-Khairiah madrasa fire =

Fire incident

- Date: 22 September 1989
- Location: Guar Chempedak, Kedah, Malaysia; 5.9°N 100.43633°E
- Also known as: 27 Syuhada Peristiwa Kebakaran Pondok Pak Ya (27 Martyrs of the Pondok Pak Ya Fire)
- Cause: Accident caused by a burning candle that was left alight in the hostel while the students had fallen asleep after studying
- Deaths: 27

The 1989 Taufiqiah al-Khairiah al-Halimiah Madrasah fire, which occurred on 22 September 1989, was a fire that took place at Taufiqiah al-Khairiah al-Halimiah madrasa (also known as Pondok Pak Ya) in Padang Lumat, Guar Chempedak, Kedah, Malaysia.

Around 27 students, mostly girls, were killed in the incident.

== Background ==
The fire at Sekolah Menengah Agama (SMA) Taufiqiah Khairiah Al-Halimiah, also known as Pondok Pak Ya, occurred at approximately 0230H (Malaysian Standard Time) on 22 September 1989. At the time, the female dormitories were illuminated by candles due to a power outage. It is believed that one of the candles accidentally fell and ignited a mattress. The flames quickly spread throughout the wooden structure, engulfing the dormitory while most of the students were asleep.

Eight wooden dormitory blocks were completely destroyed in the fire. A total of 27 female students perished in the incident. They were later buried at a special cemetery site known as "27 Syuhada Peristiwa Kebakaran Pondok Pak Ya" (The 27 Martyrs of the Pondok Pak Ya Fire Tragedy).

== Victims ==
A total of 27 victims, all women, were killed in the fire.

1. Faridah binti Che Daud
2. Kamisah binti Sudin
3. Norazura binti Abdul Wahab
4. Siti Mariam binti Zakaria
5. Khairul Asma binti Abdullah
6. Faridah binti Baharom
7. Mariani binti Lebai Hassan
8. Norasmah binti Md. Nor
9. Hamidah binti Abd. Hamid
10. Asmah binti Osman
11. Siti Noraini binti Yaacob
12. Rokiah binti Abdullah
13. Zuraini binti Md. Fadzil
14. Sarina binti Shaari
15. Norasiah binti Mehad
16. Zaharah binti Ramli
17. Asnidar binti Abu Bakar
18. Paizah binti Isa
19. Nurul Uyun binti Abdullah
20. Anisah binti Osman
21. Mashitoh binti Yaacob
22. Ezzah binti Ismail
23. Siti Aishah binti Nayan
24. Syafinaz binti Ishak
25. Suhaibah binti Mahmud
26. Rosnani binti Ismail
27. Rohani binti Syaari

== Outcome ==
The incident drew significant attention from then-Prime Minister Mahathir Mohamad, who visited the site. A Royal Commission of Inquiry determined that a candle, likely ignited flammable materials, causing the fire that destroyed eight wooden dormitory blocks and killed 27 female students, despite speculation about a gas stove contributing to the blaze. The Malaysian government subsequently mandated enhanced fire safety measures for all boarding schools to prevent future tragedies.

== Cultural impact ==
The incident was featured in an episode of Detik Tragik, a documentary series by TV3 that highlights national disasters.

In addition, a dedicated documentary aired on Astro Oasis in December 2013, offering a detailed account of the incident, with a subsequent re-broadcast on Astro Box Office.

A dramatized telemovie titled Pondok Pak Ya, directed by Wan Hasliza and produced by Astro, was also released to portray the events leading up to and following the fire.

== See also ==
- 2017 Darul Quran Ittifaqiyah madrasa fire
