= Naning =

District and former chiefdom in Malacca, Malaysia

Coordinates: 2.4590696°N 102.1695444°E

Naning نانيڠ
- Former chiefdom of Negeri Sembilan; Region of Malacca
- Location of modern-day Naning chiefdom (luak) relative to the rest of Malacca, superimposed on state assembly constituencies.
- Founded: 1641
- Annexed by the Straits Settlement of Malacca: 1832
- Website: naning.my

Naning (Note: Jawi: نانيڠ) (Note: Chinese: 南寧) is a cultural and customary region in northern Malacca, Malaysia, bordering Negeri Sembilan. It covers the constituencies of Masjid Tanah and Alor Gajah, and also includes Pulau Sebang.

Naning had historically been part of Negeri Sembilan but it was annexed by the British into Malacca in 1832 after the Naning War. Malacca was a part of the Straits Settlements at the time.

== History ==
Naning was founded in 1641 by a prince of Pagaruyung, Sutan Jatang Balun, also known as Datuk Parpatih Nan Sebatang.

In 1643, Naning entered into an agreement with Dutch Malacca which made Naning tributary to the Dutch but still maintained a degree of independence and sovereignty.

The Naning War started in 1831 and lasted for a year. The penghulu, the chief or lord of Naning at the time, Dol Said, resisted the British claim over Naning as part of Malacca. Britain demanded that Naning pay 10% of its revenue as a tribute to Malacca. Dol Said refused, leading to a British expedition in 1831.

Initially, Dol Said managed to hold out with assistance from nearby chiefdoms. However, in another offensive the following year, the British attacked Naning again with a larger force. Dol Said, abandoned by his allies this time, was defeated and he surrendered. He was offered a pension and a house in Malacca.

The confederation of original nine chiefdoms (luak) of Negeri Sembilan, at Raja Melewar's accession in 1773. Naning is shaded purple in the south.

Today, Naning, integrated into Malacca, is no longer a distinct political entity. However, it remained as a cultural and customary region (luak) governed by the adat perpatih custom, recognised under the state constitution of Malacca.

== Territorial definition ==
Naning domain covers 22 mukims of Alor Gajah District, as well as three mukims in neighbouring Jasin District.

District	Mukim
Alor Gajah District	Ramuan China Besar, Ramuan China Kechil, Sungai Baru Ulu, Masjid Tanah, Sungai Siput, Brisu, Sungai Buloh, Ayer Pa’abas, Lendu, Melekek, Taboh Naning (capital), Pegoh, Kelemak (Alor Gajah city), Pulau Sebang, Tanjung Rimau, Padang Sebang, Gadek, Melaka Pindah, Rembia, Sungai Petai, Kemuning, Tebong
Jasin District	Batang Melaka, Jus, Nyalas

== Politics ==
Prior to Dutch rule in Malacca, the region was an independent domain. In 1653, the Dutch allowed the local chiefs to elect a ruler among themselves, called Penghulu Naning. He was responsible in leading the people and upholding the adat perpatih custom in Naning area. The first Penghulu was Datuk Seraja Merah.

The Penghulu Naning was assisted by nobility from each constituent clan (suku).The clan of Sri Melenggang Taboh (formerly Biduanda) retained exclusive rights as an elector.

On 1705, Abdul Jalil Shah IV of Johor bestowed Raja Naning with legal recognition as the rightful ruler of the domain.

During British era, the position was appointed by Straits Governor in accordance to Adat Perpatih. However, after the Naning War, the penghuluship was abolished in 1832, only to be revived in 1920.

== See also ==
- Dol Said
