= 2017 Darul Quran Ittifaqiyah madrasa fire =

Fire incident in Kuala Lumpur, Malaysia

- Date: 14 September 2017
- Time: 5:10 AM (MST)
- Location: Kampung Datuk Keramat, Kuala Lumpur, Malaysia; 3.1688°N 101.7328°E
- Type: Fire accidents classified as murder
- Cause: Arson that was set by outsider drug addicts after they were taunted by students in the madrasa for entering the areas to abuse drugs
- Motive: Revenge
- Deaths: 23
- Injuries: 5
- Suspects: 7
- Convicted: Muhammad Adli Shah Bin Mohd Yusry and Muhammad Arif Firdaus Bin Juraini
- Charges: Murder under section 300(d) of the Penal Code (23 counts)
- Verdict: Guilty (Muhammad Adli Shah Bin Mohd Yusry), not guilty (Muhammad Arif Firdaus Bin Juraini)
- Convictions: Murder under section 300(d) of the Penal Code (23 counts)
- Sentence: Detention at the pleasure of the Yang di-Pertuan Agong

The 2017 Darul Quran Ittifaqiyah madrasa fire occurred around 5:10 a.m. on September 14, 2017, when a fire broke out at the Darul Quran Ittifaqiyah madrasa in Kampung Datuk Keramat, Kuala Lumpur, resulting in the deaths of 23 madrasa residents, comprising 21 students and two teachers, while five others were reportedly injured.

Investigations revealed that a quarrel had erupted between the madrasa boarders and a group of seven teenage boys who entered the area to abuse drugs they had purchased. This altercation prompted the teens to set fire to the building. All seven troubled teens had been expelled from school following numerous serious disciplinary offenses. Additional factors included a firework assault against the madrasa boarders by the same teens and a dispute over the use of the futsal court between the two parties.

== Background ==
The fire started on the second and upper floors of the madrasa building and quickly spread throughout most of the structure, blocking the only entrance and trapping the occupants inside. Many windows were fitted with bolted grills, making it difficult for the occupants to escape. Neighbouring witnesses reported that they were awakened at dawn by the cries of the students trapped inside the building. Although they tried to save them, they were unable to do so because the fire spread rapidly, with many students still trapped behind the metal window grills. Those who survived managed to escape by jumping directly to the ground, while others fled through the building's water pipelines. The fire was finally contained by the fire department at around 6:40 a.m.

== Investigations and arrests ==
Investigations were conducted by police and firefighters to determine the cause of the fire. Initially, the firefighters thought it might be due to a short circuit, but after a full investigation and through CCTV footage outside the building, several suspects were identified as having infiltrated the area around 3:10 am. Other CCTV footage retrieved from the five nearest petrol stations showed the intruding suspects earlier buying petrol at one of the stations at 1:30 am on a Yamaha Lagenda motorcycle. Around seven suspects were identified by police to be involved, and most of them were apprehended on September 16, 2017, and detained at the Jinjang Police Station lock-up. Survivors were detained at the Ministry of Defence tent set up outside the madrasa before being placed in secret premises around Keramat on September 15. The number of survivors was also kept confidential, and only the closest relatives were allowed to enter the premises to protect them from being approached by the public. Kuala Lumpur Police Chief Amar Singh concluded in a special press conference that the suspects were believed to have committed the crime out of revenge due to incidents of taunting among the madrasa students and the suspects. According to him, six out of seven suspects tested positive for drugs, and two of them had previous criminal records related to rioting and stealing vehicles. All suspects were aged between 11 and 18 years old. On August 17, 2020, Muhammad Adli Shah Bin Mohd Yusry was found guilty of 23 counts of murder and was sentenced to detention at the pleasure of the Yang-Dipertuan Agong.

== Reactions ==
The tragedy gained considerable attention from the government, the public, and media abroad. Al Jazeera described the incident as "the most devastating fire in Malaysia since the beginning of the year".

=== Government ===
The tragedy was widely addressed by leaders from both political parties. Yang di-Pertuan Agong, Sultan Muhammad V, and Prime Minister Najib Razak visited the scene. Najib sent condolences to all the victims and urged all madrasas to comply with safety standards and regulations to prevent similar incidents in the future. Deputy Prime Minister Ahmad Zahid Hamidi was the first to arrive at the scene in the afternoon following the incident. He highlighted the lack of control and training in madrasas, which led to various issues such as fires, abuse, the establishment of illegal madrasas, and the appointment of unqualified teachers. Former Prime Minister Mahathir Mohamad expressed his disappointment, noting that no lessons seemed to have been learned from a similar incident in 1989.

== See also ==
- 1989 Taufiqiah Al-Khairiah madrasa fire
