= Guar Chempedak =

Town in Kedah, Malaysia

Coordinates: 5°52′N 100°28′E

Guar Chempedak in Yan District

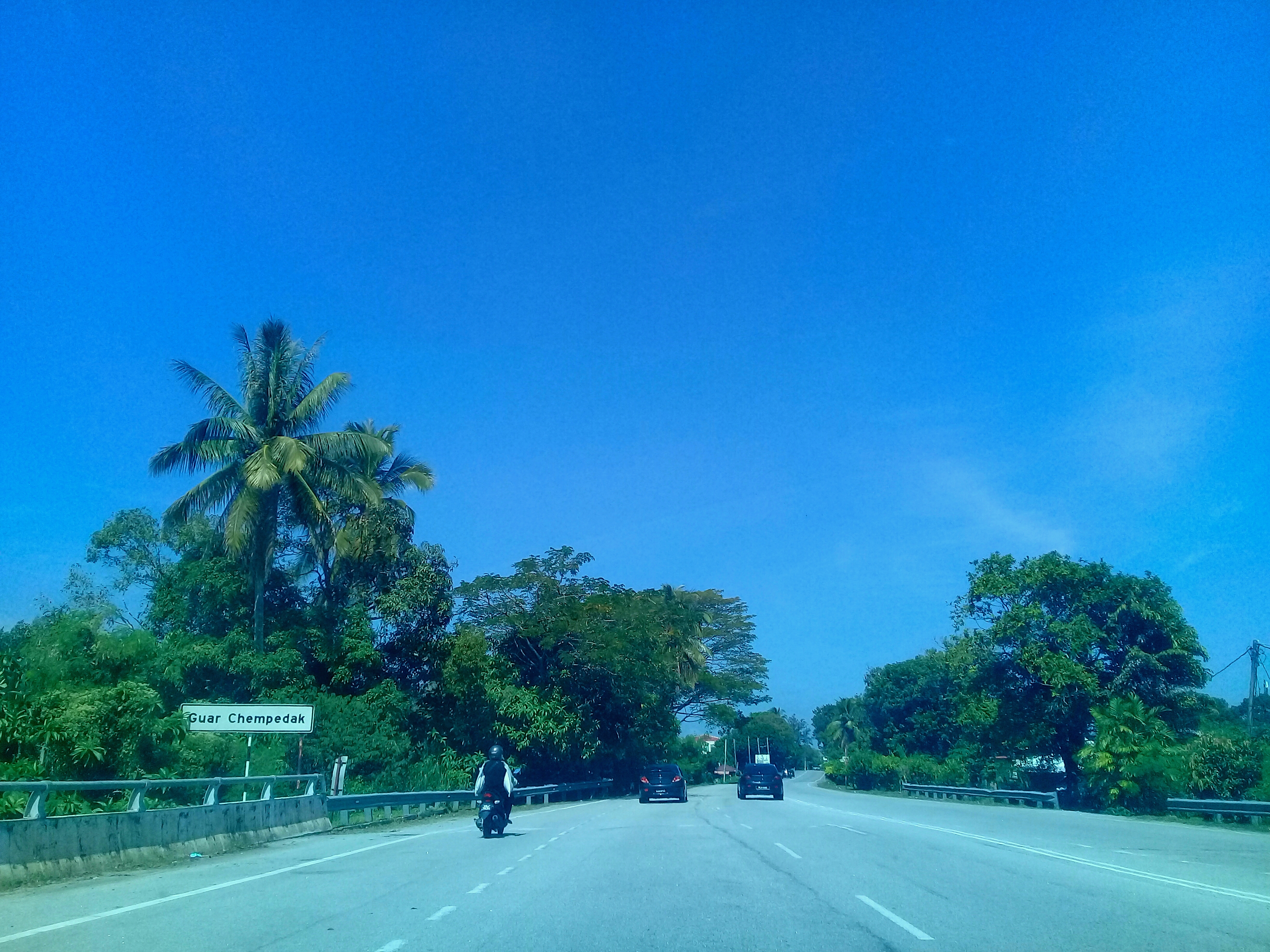
Guar Chempedak.

Guar Chempedak is a small town in Yan District, Kedah, Malaysia. Guar Chempedak is situated within the parliamentary constituency of Jerai. Guar Chempedak comes from two words, in which Guar means 'hilly land' and Chempedak or cempedak is a name of a fruit that is believed to be widely available here in any season.

It was where the tragic 1989 Taufiqiah Al-Khairiah madrasa fire occurred.

Majority of the population here are of Malay descent, and a small number of Chinese and Indians also reside here. Although most of the town is relatively rural, in recent years more infrastructure has been developed, including shop houses and residential areas.
