= Dol Said =

Malaysian warrior

Dol Said (Jawi: دول سعيد; August 1773–1849) or in full Dato' Abdul Said Omar was a 19th-century Malay leader of the Naning region in Malaya. Naning was then part of Negeri Sembilan before its annexation into Malacca, then a Straits Settlement. He opposed the taxation policy of the British in the area and refused to pay it which lead to the Naning War.

Dol Said's resistance led the British to send 150 soldiers led by Captain Wyllie to capture Naning in early August 1831. Naning however successfully defended itself by employing guerilla tactics and reverting aid from Malay allies, which included the chiefdoms of Seri Menanti, Rembau, Sungai Ujong, Johol and Muar. The British realized that the rebelling forces could not be easily suppressed, and requested reinforcement from the Yamtuan Muda Raja Ali in Rembau. Raja Ali agreed to send 600 troops to assist British in suppressing the revolt. Later in March 1832, the British sent a larger force, consisting of 1200 soldiers to defeat Dol Said's men. In the second attack, Naning failed to receive military aid from its neighbours, and along with the presence of a huge British expedition force, caused Dol Said to retreat to Seri Menanti before surrendering himself to the British, effectively ending the conflict. The British then incorporated Naning into their colony of Malacca.

Dol Said is remembered in contemporary Malaysian historiography as an anti-colonial patriot and forerunner of Malaysian nationalism.

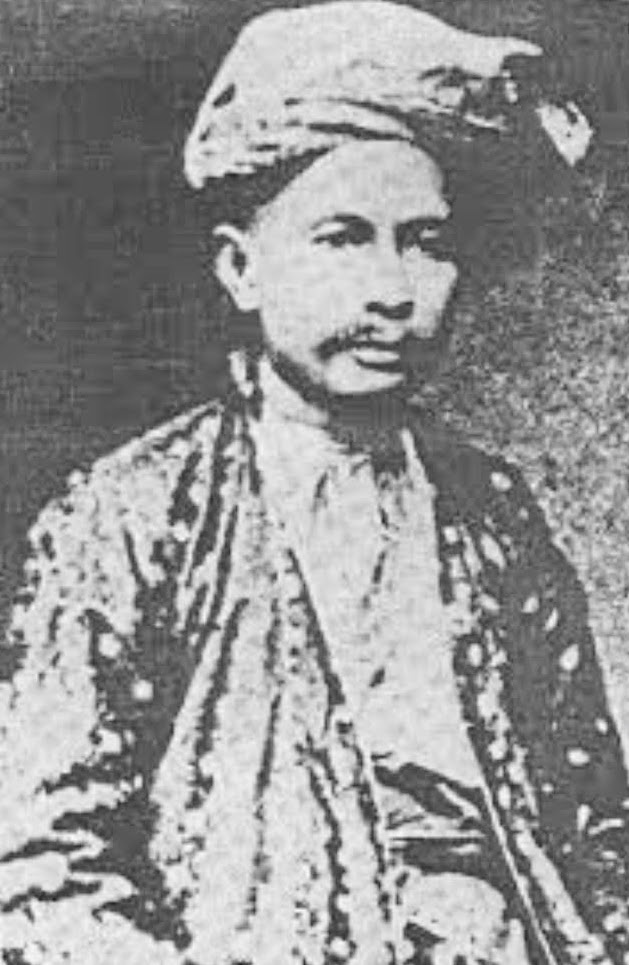
The picture often attributed to Dol Said is not him. It is a Sungai Ujong nobleman whose name is Dato' Syed Abdul Rahman.

Tombstone of Dol Said in Taboh, Naning, Malacca
