= Naning War =

19th century conflict

The Naning War
Date	6 August 1831 – 15 June 1832
Location	British Malaya
Result	See Results: First War (1831): Dol Said victory; Dol Said achieved an early victory against British forces in 1831 before Naning was defeated in 1832; Second War (1832): British victory; After requesting assistance from Yamtuan Muda Raja Ali of Rembau, Raja Ali agreed to send 600 soldiers to support the British campaign against Naning.
Territorial changes	Naning incorporated into the district of Malacca

Belligerents
British East India Company	Naning

Commanders and leaders
(United Kingdom) Robert Ibbetson (United Kingdom) William Thomas Lewis	Dol Said

The Naning War (6 August 1831 – 15 June 1832), also known as the Naning Conflict or Naning Revolt, was a conflict in the region surrounding Malacca, which was part of the Straits Settlements under British control. The conflict was fought between British East India Company (EIC), which had taken over Malacca and its neighbouring areas from the Dutch in 1824, against the Malay chiefdom of Naning, located adjacent to Malacca.

The causes of the Naning War stemmed from the expanding British interests in the Malay Peninsula and a dispute over the extent of British jurisdiction, particularly their right to impose taxation on Naning. The British, after two military expeditions, ultimately defeated Naning and fully incorporated its territory under Malacca's jurisdiction.

This conflict is one of the earliest instances of British intervention in the Malay states. However, the high monetary cost of the war prompted the British to adopt a more cautious approach in their future dealings with the Malay states. Rather than pursuing aggressive military action, they increasingly relied on political influence, a strategy that eventually led to the Treaty of Pangkor in 1874 and the establishment of the 'Resident System'.

Today, Dol Said, the chief (Penghulu) of Naning, is celebrated as a nationalist hero in Malaysia for his resistance against foreign aggression.

== Background to the conflict ==
Negeri Sembilan in 1773. Naning is shown in purple, covering the northern one-third of present-day Melaka state (Alor Gajah and Jasin Districts).

Naning was a small inland Malay chiefdom (locally known as luak) of about 200 sq mi (520 km^{2}). It was located about 19 mi (31 km) from the city of Malacca and within the borders of the present-day Masjid Tanah constituency, which borders Negeri Sembilan. It, along with Sungai Ujong, Rembau, Kelang, Johol, Jelai (Inas), Jelebu and Ulu Pahang, was one of the nine luaks that made up the first iteration of Negeri Sembilan. Like its neighbouring chiefdoms, it traditionally acknowledged the suzerainty of the Kingdom of Malacca and, after Malacca's fall, that of the Sultan of Johor. However, from the 17th century on it had gradually come under the dependency of the Dutch in Malacca. This relationship was formalised in 1757 when the Sultan of Johor ceded his nominal rights of suzerainty over Naning and its neighbouring chiefdoms around Malacca to the Dutch. However, Naning's position as a dependency of the Dutch appeared to be more nominal than real. Although the Dutch invaded and forced Naning to sign a treaty in 1643, whereby Naning would pay a yearly tribute of one-tenth of their produce and accept Dutch advice in governing, the treaty was never enforced. By 1765, the Dutch commuted the tenth to a nominal yearly tribute of 400 gantangs of paddy, which was about one one-thousandth of the total crop produced in Naning at that time. The Dutch also did not interfere with the administration of Naning, which was exclusively governed by its traditional Penghulus.

During the brief British occupation of Malacca from 1795 to 1818 when the Napoleonic Wars were raging in Europe, a treaty was signed between the British and the new Penghulu of Naning, Dol Said in 1801. The treaty included a clause for the British to continue receiving the right to one-tenth of the produce of Naning as stipulated by the earlier 1643 Dutch treaty. However, this was commuted to a yearly payment of 400 gantangs of paddy due to the poverty of Naning. In 1807, the British residents of Malacca also issued a directive depriving the Penghulu of his power of passing the death sentence although there was no evidence to indicate that this was enforced.

The British formally took control of Malacca and its surrounding territories from the Dutch with the signing of the Anglo-Dutch Treaty of 1824. Following the takeover, the British started to examine the extent of their control over the acquired territories to maximise revenue from the lands. The British governor Robert Fullerton took the 1643 Dutch and 1801 British treaties at face value and assessed Naning to be part of Malacca. He instructed the Superintendent of Lands in Malacca, William Thomas Lewis, to conduct a census in Naning as well as an assessment of the potential of the land in anticipation of extending the Malacca land system, including the levying of a ten-percent tax on all produce, to Naning. There were also plans to transform the Penghulu of Naning Dol Said and his traditional chiefs into salaried officials of the East India Company.

However, Dol Said contested the British juridical claims over Naning and the imposition of the ten percent tax and chose to continue sending the traditional payment of 400 gantangs of rice instead. He also carried out what the British considered to be increasingly aggressive actions that challenged their rule. These included passing sentence on a murder case in Naning instead of referring it to Malacca as required under the 1807 directive, as well as the seizing of some fruit from lands which the British considered part of Malacca's territory (Dol Said had claimed that the lands were Naning territory). These perceived transgressions led Fullerton's successor, Governor Robert Ibbetson to decide in early 1831, to send in British troops to enforce British jurisdiction over Naning and to punish Dol Said, believing his resistance could embolden the locals in Malacca to defy the British.

== Causes of the conflict ==
The origins of the Naning conflict are multifaceted and cannot be attributed to a singular cause.

=== Conflicting concepts of jurisdiction over Naning ===
One main cause of the conflict was over the uncertain status of Naning vis-a-vis Malacca. This stemmed in part from problems in interpreting the 1801 treaty between Britain and Naning and the earlier 1643 treaty signed between the Dutch and Naning. During a meeting of the Penang Council (Note: Penang was the capital of the Straits Settlement at that time and the Penang Council was the executive council helping the governor run the Straits Settlements.) on 30 January 1828, which discussed the status of Naning, the Resident-Councillor of Malacca, Samuel Garling, noted that the evidence based on the 1801 treaty and Dutch records "favours the independence of Naning" and that the British had "no ground" to claim sovereignty or jurisdiction over Naning. In particular, Garling pointed out the vagueness of the description of Naning as "Tannah Company" (company land) in the 1801 treaty and concluded that there was no "tenable ground" by which the British could establish a "claim of sovereignty" over Naning. Garling's assessment was supported by the acting Resident-Councillor of Penang, Anderson, who felt that the British right to subject Naning to the same government as Malacca was "not very clearly established". He felt that Dol Said should be considered a hereditary chief who had been exercising his rule without interruption, which was the prerogative of a sovereign in his own district.

However, Fullerton disagreed and felt that based on the earlier treaties and Dutch records, Naning was completely under British sovereignty and that the Penghulu of Naning was like any of the other Penghulus appointed within Malacca territory and held his "powers of investiture from the Malacca Government". Fullerton regarded the 1801 treaty not as a treaty but rather as "articles or conditions" on Naning dictated by the then Governor of Malacca. He felt that Naning was "evidently a place subject to Malacca". Fullerton believed this to be substantiated by the Dutch records which indicated that the first ruler of Naning was appointed by the Dutch in 1642 who awarded him a seal of office as ruler of Naning. Prior to this, there had not been a single ruler over the territory. Fullerton thus believed that Naning had been an integral part of Malacca since Dutch rule in 1641 and that the British had inherited this when they took over Malacca from the Dutch.

Part of this confusion was what academic Jonathan Cave has described as a "collision of systems" between the British's ideas of sovereignty and the concept of traditional Malay rule and governance, which were based on Malay customs and adat. This was manifested in different understandings by both sides regarding the exact nature of the land jurisdiction over Naning that Britain had inherited from the Dutch, which was the cause of the conflict. To the British, Dol Said derived his authority and position from his appointment first from the Dutch and subsequently from the British. However, in his exchanges with the British, Dol Said continuously referred to his jurisdiction over Naning as stemming from the adat or 'customs' of the Malays which vested in him the 'sacrosanctity' of Malay kingship. To his followers, Dol Said's legitimacy stemmed from his ability to trace his authority from the Malaccan kingdom as represented by regalia which was associated with Malaccan royalty. However, the British officials had been largely contemptuous or condescending towards the importance placed on these Malay customs in their reports, dismissing it simply an excuse to act against a centralizing authority.

=== Excessive taxation ===
Another factor that contributed to the conflict was the issue of taxation. Writing during that period of time, Munshi Abdullah noted in his autobiography (Hikayat Abdullah), that it has been the custom since ancient times for Naning to make annual payments according to its means to Malacca. This could take various forms including rice, poultry or fruit. Abdullah pointed out that the Dutch had previously invaded Naning and compelled it to pay an annual tribute to Malacca. This was subsequently commuted willingly by the Dutch to a nominal payment of 400 gantangs of rice which Naning accepted and paid. However, Abdullah claimed that when the EIC had decided to impose a tax of one-tenth of all the produce of Naning and its dependent villages instead of the annual tribute, Dol Said considered this to be an excessive demand and he refused to comply with it. When the British attempted to collect the full tenth, the Malays saw it as a breach of faith of what had been agreed upon as part of the 1801 treaty. There were also some fears by the neighbouring chiefdoms that once Naning had been conquered, the same tax would be levied upon the adjacent chiefdoms as well.

Part of the problem appeared to have arisen from the method by which Naning's output had been calculated by Lewis which greatly inflated the tax that could be collected. This probably affected Fullerton's perception of Naning, leading him to make an incorrect assessment regarding Naning's potential tax revenue. Lewis had estimated that Naning could yield at least 753,450 gantangs of rice a year and that the tax collected as part of the tenth (7,534 gantangs) would yield a revenue of $3,767 a year (currency unknown). However, this assessment appeared to have been compiled based on Lewis' own arbitrary assessment rather than any detailed study of the land in Naning. As Cave highlighted, Lewis did not appear to have taken into account the situation on the ground such as the variations in soil and types of crop nor did he conduct a topographical, cadastral or agronomic survey. After the conflict it was discovered that Naning could only produce around 130,000 gantang of rice and an annual profit of only $298.

=== British interests in Southeast Asia ===
The origins of the Naning conflict must also be understood within the larger geopolitical developments in Britain and the Malay Peninsula during that period. Academic Emrys Chew argued that there was a rethinking at the beginning of the nineteenth century among British leaders about the growing importance of Asia to British foreign interests. Coupled with this was the widely held belief among ordinary Britons that their empire would be imperiled without the vigorous assertion of British power and influence in Asia. Both factors created the necessary conditions for local British officials in Southeast Asia to pursue a more aggressive policy. At the same time, local developments in the colonies during a period of colonial history which academic A.J. Stockwell described as a time of turbulent frontiers for the British in Southeast Asia also resulted in the British being willing to take a more interventionist approach in the Malay peninsula. The wealth gained by the Straits Settlements from the burgeoning trade with China gave rise to stronger demands by British merchants for greater intervention in the Malay states to ensure the stability and security of the Straits Settlements. These led to several interventions by the British beyond the Straits Settlements into the Malay states in the early half of the 19th century of which Naning could possibly be considered the first.

=== Man on the spot ===
Various British colonial officials, were able to exercise power disproportionately greater than their positions and often at their discretion, given the administrative delays made by long-distance communication between them in Malaya and their superiors in India and Britain. In particular, the decisions made by British Governor Fullerton and his successor Ibbetson and the then-Superintendent of Lands at Malacca Lewis with regards to Naning, served to create the conditions necessary for the conflict to break out.

American academic Lennox Mills highlighted that one of the main causes of the conflict stemmed from Fullerton's assessment that when the British had taken over Malacca from the Dutch, they had also inherited the legal rights the Dutch had previously secured to administer Naning. This led Fullerton to adopt an aggressive policy in seeking to enforce this right to levy and collect the tax from Naning. This was despite advice from other colonial officials such as Garling and Anderson who had more local experience and who disagreed with Fullerton's assessment regarding the nature of Malacca's jurisdiction over Naning. Mills also argued that Fullerton's successor Ibbetson was at fault for deciding on pursuing the conflict with Naning despite his realization that the British's jurisdiction over Naning and the corresponding right to collect the tax was based on weak grounds. This was also in spite of instructions from his superiors in England to waive the tax during the lifetime of Dol Said. However, Ibbetson had justified the need to dispatch troops to apprehend Dol Said as the latter's successful defiance of the British could similarly encourage other Malaccans to refuse to pay their taxes.

Another key British official who had a hand in starting the conflict was Lewis who as the superintendent of lands, served as the point man for the British in dealing with Naning. He was one of the keenest advocates for the British to exercise every legal right over Naning and had constantly pressed Fullerton to do so. Mills also attributed blame to Lewis for a series of mistakes (intentional or otherwise) which swayed Fullerton's decisions. These include inflating the amount of potential taxes collectible from Naning and translating letters from Dol Said in a manner that made the latter sounded belligerent. Lewis also misjudged the sentiments of the locals towards Dol Said which led to him making incorrect assessments and claims that the removal of Dol Said would be supported by the people in Naning.

Dol Said had reacted to the British demands in a manner which led to it being misconstrued by the British as a challenge to their rule. Prior to the conflict, the British in Malacca had made repeated requests in 1828 and 1829 for Dol Said to meet with Fullerton in Malacca to discuss some of the problems regarding the status of Naning. However Dol Said had refused and limited himself to corresponding through letters, which as Cave established, lent itself open to incorrect translations of key phrases and interpretations of meaning. Dol Said's actions during the period including hearing a murder case despite having been instructed to refer it to Malacca and confiscating fruits from trees on what the British considered to be Malaccan land were also interpreted by the British to be an act of opposing the state. This was especially in light of Fullerton's understanding of the former's position as simply an appointee of the state.

== Outbreak of the conflict ==
=== First military expedition ===
The first military expedition to Naning left Malacca on 6 August 1831. The force consisted of about 150 Indian sepoys, their British officers and an artillery train of 6-pounders. Lewis also accompanied the expedition as he was slated to be the superintendent of Naning once Dol Said was removed. There are no known figures of Naning's forces although Ibbetson subsequently claimed that they numbered in their thousands. The British were initially optimistic about their chances. James Begbie, a British officer on the expedition noted that the force was regarded as "disproportionately large" for the job that it had to achieve and that the entire expedition was termed as a "picnic". The expedition made good time in its travels to Naning. It soon inflicted the first casualty of the campaign when some sepoys fired upon and killed one of the military chief (Panglima) from Naning who Begbie claimed had tried to bar the expedition as soon as it crossed the border of Naning. (Dol Said claimed that the Panglima had been sent to escort the expedition.)

However, things soon started to go against the British. The boats which were intended to ferry provisions for the expedition as it worked its way up the Malacca River to Naning soon ran aground due to the insufficient depth of the river. Once the expedition crossed the border into Naning, they came under regular sniping from Naning's forces which soon contributed to the perception within the expedition that they were surrounded by an overwhelming enemy. Naning's forces also felled trees along the route of the expedition, forcing the British to spend time and effort clearing them whilst under fire.

The expedition soon began to run out of rations and upon learning that Naning had received help and troops from neighbouring states including Rembau, a decision was made to retreat to the borders of Malacca. At the same time, panic begun engulfed Malacca when the rumour that the surrounding Malay chiefdoms were gathering to invade Malacca spread, and there soon emerged repeated demands for the expedition to return to defend the town. The expedition arrived back at Malacca on 24 August 1831, three weeks after it had set off and having had to abandon all its guns and stores along the way.

=== Preparations for the second expedition ===
Following the failure of the first military expedition, the British sought to break the alliance between Rembau and Naning. The British governor Ibbetson met with the chiefs of Rembau on 20 January 1832 and secured their agreement to support the British in the latter's subsequent attempts to capture Dol Said. In return, the British reassured Rembau that it did not have territorial ambitions over the surrounding Malay chiefdoms and renounced whatever claims it might have had over Rembau and recognised it as an independent sovereign state. At the same time, the British began to receive reinforcements from India which raised the total number of troops to around 1,500 by the end of January 1832. The British government also made logistical preparations to ensure the success of their second expedition including expanding parts of the narrow road between Malacca and Naning.

During this period, Dol Said contacted several individuals in Malacca requesting that they intercede with the British government on his behalf. Dol Said offered to return the artillery pieces the British had abandoned during the first expedition and to vacate his position in favour of either his son or nephew in return for no further action to be taken against him. However, the British government refused to deal with Dol Said unless the latter was willing to surrender unconditionally. At the same time Dol Said also continued making preparations for the anticipated British assault. He tried to reach out to some of the surrounding Malay chiefdoms and tried to convince them to ally with him again against the British but did not appear to have been successful.

=== Second military expedition ===
The second military expedition to Naning commenced on 7 February 1832. In contrast to the first expedition, the British advanced cautiously, sending out smaller detachments to secure key locations before the main body advanced. The British also received help from a contingent of men from Rembau. Resistance from the Naning forces were also less aggressive than during the first expedition. While they continued to snipe at the British, they did not try to stand up to the British advance until they neared Dol Said's home village of Taboh. Many of the Malay villages along the route of advance had been abandoned by their inhabitants before the arrival of the British. As the British approached Taboh, a number of the Malay chiefs under Dol Said also started to surrender to the advancing British forces, claiming that they had been coerced into supporting Dol Said.

Dol Said made one final attempt to negotiate with the British in Malacca as the British troops approached his village. He met with a representative of the British on 4 June 1832 where he claimed that he had been tricked and misled by his advisers (including several Dutch merchants in Malacca) in his previous dealings with the British. He also claimed that his actions thus far were not directed against the British government in Malacca but rather against Lewis who he claimed had intruded into his territory and killed one of his Panglima. He also offered to surrender if his terms were met (no details on what these terms were) but the British rejected.

The British reached Taboh on 15 June 1832, after brushing aside some small resistance at the edge of the village. Most of the inhabitants and defenders had fled just ahead of the British arrival and the British occupied the town with ease. This brought an end to the Naning conflict.

== Aftermath of the conflict ==
Dol Said fled from Taboh as the British closed in and sought safety in one of the neighboring Malay chiefdoms. The British issued a reward of 2,000 Spanish dollars for his capture to no success. Dol Said eventually surrendered to the British on 4 February 1834, in return for the promise of a pardon. After his surrender, Dol Said was permitted by the British to remain in Malacca where he was well treated. His presence was regarded by the British as a means of securing the goodwill of the local population as well as the neighbouring Malay chiefdoms. Dol Said remained in Malacca until his death in August 1849. During this time, the British provided Dol Said with a house and some land in Malacca. They also provided him with a pension of 200 rupees a month. While in Malacca, Dol Said continued practicing as a traditional medicine man and remained well-respected by the Malay population.

Following the conflict, the British incorporated Naning (now Taboh Naning) more firmly into its fold and began to administer it as a district of Malacca. British laws were imposed and the British took over the appointment of the local Malay chiefs which had previously been the prerogative of the Malay chieftains such as Dol Said. A Malaccan of Dutch descent, J.B. Westerhout, was appointed as the new superintendent of Naning and charged with the responsibility of administering the territory and collecting the overdue land tax. Some of the former chiefs who had support Dol Said were also shipped to India to stand trial for their involvement in the conflict.

== Legacy ==
The Naning conflict marked one of the earliest attempts by the British to safeguard their interests in Malaya through intervening in the interior Malay chiefdoms. However, the high cost, difficulties encountered as well as limited monetary returns from the conflict resulted in the British adopting a less aggressive and military-based policy towards dealing with the rest of the Malay states for the next few decades. Instead, the British sought to expand their influence politically among the Malay rulers, culminating in with the signing of the Pangkor Treaty and the creation of the "residential" system in 1874.

Dol Said has been regarded as a hero in modern-day Malaysia and the state of Malacca. He has been portrayed in Malaysian history textbooks and the Malacca state government as a hero who had defiantly stood up to world power and resisted the unlawful imposition of taxation by the British on his territories.

== Historiography and scholarship of the conflict ==
The portrayal of the Naning conflict within the academic historiography of early British colonialism in Malaya has evolved over time. The first records of the conflict were by British colonial officials who were either involved in the conflict such as Begbie, or had access to the British records of the event such as Thomas Braddell. The narrative of the conflict presented by these colonial officials following the conflict were generally bias towards the role of the British. It justified the right of the British to levy the tax on Naning and explained the military expedition as the forced response to the aggression and unreasonableness of Dol Said, who had constantly refused the efforts by the British in Malacca to resolve the dispute peacefully. In this narrative, Dol Said and the local Malays were not provided with any agency or voice in explaining their resistance to the British. Instead Begbie labelled Dol Said as a "tyrant" that had "rendered himself obnoxious" to his people through his oppression and arbitrary exactions from them.

The first challenge to this official colonial historiography of the conflict came from Mills in the 1920s, who like a number of American academics at that time, had been somewhat critical of the effects of British colonialism. Mills took a contradictory position to the earlier works by Begbie and Braddell in challenging the justification for the conflict. By re-looking at the set of colonial documents produced during the conflict, Mills assessed that the entire Naning war had been an "egregious blunder" due to "hasty actions" taken by the British officials on the spot based on insufficient and incorrect information. Mills lay the blame for the conflict primarily on a series of blunders by the three key British actors involved, namely Governor Robert Fullerton and his successor Robert Ibbetson and the Superintendent of Lands William Lewis in their handling the situation prior to the conflict.

Following the period of decolonialisation and the advocating of the ideas of autonomous history by academics such as John R.W. Smail, there was a shift towards trying to understand the Naning conflict beyond its colonial underpinnings. This has resulted in a growing trend to review and understand the conflict as a clash between two different systems during that particular period of time as well as providing greater agency and voice to the Malay actors involved.

One example was Jonathan Cave who attempted to situate the conflict within larger regional developments at that time. Through his extensive monograph Naning in Melaka, Cave conducted an in-depth review of the primary British colonial sources and events leading up to the Naning war in order to understand if the conflict was inevitable. Unlike his predecessors, Cave did not seek to ascribed blame to any side. Instead he argued that the conflict was the result of a "collision of systems" between the British's ideas of sovereignty during the onset of its early territorial expansion in Malaya and the Malay leaders who continued ascribing to their traditional customs and concepts of governance and rulership based on adat. Cave also argued that this clash of systems was manifested in the conflicting understanding of the nature of the jurisdiction over Naning that Britain had inherited from the Dutch which was one of the causes of the conflict.

Emrys Chew situated the conflict within larger regional and global developments. Chew went beyond the usual colonial records and examined new secondary sources that shed light on the nature of state and society in the Malay world. He argued that the Naning War should be understood as part of a deeper indigenous resistance and protest against the early onset of Western colonialism in the region. In particular, Chew argued that the conflict could be regarded as an example of the preliminary clash between the new ideas of colonial sovereignty being imposed by the British and the traditional notions of Malay rule which was being threatened. Chew pointed out that the British regarded Naning as a vassal territory whose ruler owed his appointment and authority to them whereas to the locals in Naning, the Penghulu was the de facto ruler of the territory with all the trappings of Malay rulership conferred on him through his regalia.

Chew also attempts to situate the conflict within broader geopolitical developments and British geostrategic calculations. British officials in London, India, and the Straits Settlements became increasingly mindful of Asia's strategic importance for trade and industry, and the need to secure Britain's expanding vital interest in resource-rich areas. This encouraged colonial officials to adopt a more proactive, interventionist approach toward neighboring Malay kingdoms. Chew also introduces the concept of a British civilising mission, the moral imperative to bring the rule of law, sovereign authority, and other forms of modern civilization to a Malay society perceived as feudal and backward. It added momentum to British forward movements in Naning and the wider peninsula, thus contradicting every preference for cost-cutting non-interference.

== Bibliography ==
- Ahmad, Darus (1957). Dol Sa'id Pahlawan Naning. Penang: Sinaran Bros.
- Begbie, P. J. (1967). The Malayan Peninsula. Kuala Lumpur: Oxford University Press.
- Braddell, Thomas (1856). "Notes on Naning". Journal of the Indian Archipelago and Eastern Asia (New series 1).
- Cave, Jonathan (1989). Sheppard, Mubin (ed.). Naning in Melaka. Vol. Monograph No. 16. Petaling Jaya: Printed for the Council of the Malaysian Branch of the Royal Asiatic Society by Eagle Trading. ISBN 9789839961416.
- Chew, Emrys (1998). "The Naning War, 1831–1832: Colonial Authority and Malay Resistance in the Early Period of British Expansion". Modern Asian Studies. 32 (2): 351–387. doi:10.1017/S0026749X9800287X. S2CID 146591613.
- Harfield, Alan. G. (1984). "The Naning Campaign of 1831 and 1832". British & Indian Armies in the East Indies, 1685–1935. Chippenham: Picton Publishing (Chippenham). ISBN 0-7855-3483-0.
- Hill, A. H., trans. (1969). The Hikayat Abdullah: The Autobiography of Abdullah Bin Abdul Kadir, 1797–1854. Singapore: Oxford University Press. ISBN 0-19-582626-4.
- Mills, Lennox A. (1925). "The Naning War, 1831–32". British Malaya, 1824–67. Kuala Lumpur: Oxford University Press. ISBN 9789679948264.
- Stockwell, A.J. (1999). "British Expansion and Rule in Southeast Asia". In Porter, Andrew; Rogar Louis, William (eds.). The Oxford History of the British Empire. Oxford: Oxford University Press. ISBN 978-0-19-521658-5.
- Turnbull, Constance Mary (1972). "Malacca and Naning". The Straits Settlements 1826–67: Indian Presidency to Crown Colony. London: Athlone Press. ISBN 9780485131321.
- Zainuddin, Ruslan (2003). "Perang Naning, 1831-2". Sejarah Malaysia (2 ed.). Shah Alam: Penerbit Fajar Bakti. ISBN 9676566713.
