= Siti Wan Kembang =

Legendary Malay queen

Che Siti Wan Kembang (Kelantanese: Che' Siti Wey Kembey, Jawi: چئ سيتي وان كمبڠ) was a legendary queen who reigned over a region on the east coast of Peninsular Malaysia, now located within the Malaysian state of Kelantan. She ruled in 1610–1667.

Che Siti was famous for her wisdom and descended from the royalty of Champa, Kelantan and Pattani.

She was known as a warrior queen and engaged in battle on horseback with a sword accompanied by an army of female horseriders. It was said that she and her adopted daughter Puteri Saadong possessed mystical powers.

There is still no clear archaeological evidence to prove the authenticity and existence of her that frequently appear in classical tales and folklore, especially those set within Kelantan Malay society.

== Background ==
According to folk tale, Cik Siti Wan Kembang was born in 1585. Her parents were Raja Ahmad and Cik Banun, both of royal lineage. Raja Ahmad was crowned Ruler of Kelantan in 1584.

However, Raja Ahmad died in 1589, when the princess was only 4 years old. Therefore, Raja Hussein of Johor was made Regent of Kelantan. Cik Siti Wan Kembang ascended to the throne of Kelantan in 1610 AD upon the death of Raja Hussein. She was said to have resided in Gunung Chinta Wangsa (5°11′10″N 102°24′40″E), Gua Musang, located approximately 45 km from Kuala Krai.

Cik Siti never married, and therefore never had children of her own. She adopted Puteri Saadong as her daughter. Puteri Saadong was the princess of the ruler of Jembal, whom Cik Siti had close ties with.

== Kijang coins ==
Differing views are given regarding the origin of the Kijang gold coins. Kijang means "muntjac" in the Malay language and derives its name from the engravings of said animal on the coin. The Kijang coins are generally associated with Cik Siti.

According to Kelantanese folklore, the kijang is her favorite pet and she has always been fond of it since young, while some stories suggest that there was once an Arab trader who came to her country to seek permission to trade and presented a muntjac to the Queen as a gift. She became very fond of the muntjac and took it as her pet, to the point that she ordered its image to be inscribed on the gold coins of her country.

Another version was linked to the influence of Saivite Hinduism. The connection was based on the fact that the earliest issue of Kijang coins resembled the Indian humped-back bull and the bull motif was depicted on ancient Hindu coins which were circulated in the northern Malay states.

Another separate version pointed out that the Kijang engraved on the coin may be a Dibatag, a species of antelope from Somalia that was brought in by Arab traders to her country and misclassified as a "muntjac". This would solve the anomaly of a deer bearing a long tail as depicted on the engravings of the coin.

== Jelasin Fort ==
Jelasin fort (Malay: Kota Jelasin, 6°5′15″N 102°13′41″E) is situated in the southern suburbs of Kota Bharu, the state capital of Kelantan. The site is approximately 4 to 8 kilometres from the town centre, in the ward of Wakaf Che Yeh. It was built in 1563 for Cik Siti Wan Kembang, her adopted daughter Puteri Saadong and Puteri Saadong's husband, Raja Abdullah.

Located on the eastern banks of the Kelantan River, the fort was made from thick wood with beautiful carvings and was very famous during the reign of Che Siti. It was used to defend Kelantan from outside attacks. According to history, Jelasin Fort was attacked by the King of Siam and Puteri Saadong disappeared after that. The condition of the fort soon deteriorated after her disappearance and the ruins of the fort is hardly noticeable nowadays as not much effort has been taken to conserve it.

== Succession ==
Legend has it that Che Siti never died but instead "disappeared" into the mystical world, and reappears from time to time. After her "disappearance", she was succeeded by her adopted daughter, Puteri Saadong, who was the youngest daughter of Raja Loyor, the Raja of Jembal.

== See also ==
- History of Kelantan
- Women warriors in literature and culture
  - List of women warriors in folklore
