= Puteri Saadong =

Malay queen

Puteri Saadong (died after 1671), was the queen regnant of Kelantan in 1667–1671. She was the adopted daughter of Siti Wan Kembang (Che Siti), the legendary Queen of Kelantan.

She was the daughter of Raja Loyor, the Raja of Jembal, and married Raja Abdullah.

Siti Wan Kembang, who ruled from 1610 to 1667, abdicated her throne in favor of her adopted daughter Puteri Saadong and Saadong ruled for four years before she was abducted by the Siamese and made a concubine of the king.

== Folklore ==
Puteri Saadong was brought up in Bukit Marak by Che Siti, after her mother died.

Che Siti gave Puteri Saadong's hand in marriage to her cousin, Raja Abdullah bin al-Marhum Sultan Samiruddin, Raja of Kelantan-Selatan (Jembal) when the princess was only 15 years old.

She was captured by the Siamese and forced to become a concubine of King Narai of Siam (now Thailand) in order to spare her husband's life. Raja Abdullah vowed to wait for her return and never to remarry. However, after several years Raja Abdullah gave up and remarried.

When Puteri Saadong returned to Bukit Marak after she managed to heal the King Narai of Siam who promised her freedom if she can heal his disease, she found Raja Abdullah remarried with a princess who used to envy her marital status with Raja Abdullah before, a quarrel ensued. It was believed that Puteri Saadong, overwhelmed with rage, killed Raja Abdullah with her hair pin.

After the incident, Puteri Saadong left Bukit Marak and subsequently disappeared. Raja Abdullah's tomb can still be seen at Padang Halban, Melor in the district of Bachok, Kelantan.
