= 2006 in Malaysia =

- Decades: 1980s; 1990s; 2000s; 2010s; 2020s
- See also: Other events of 2006; History of Malaysia • Timeline • Years

This article lists important figures and events in Malaysian public affairs during the year 2006, together with births and deaths of notable Malaysians. 2006 marked is 49th anniversary of Malaysia's Independence.

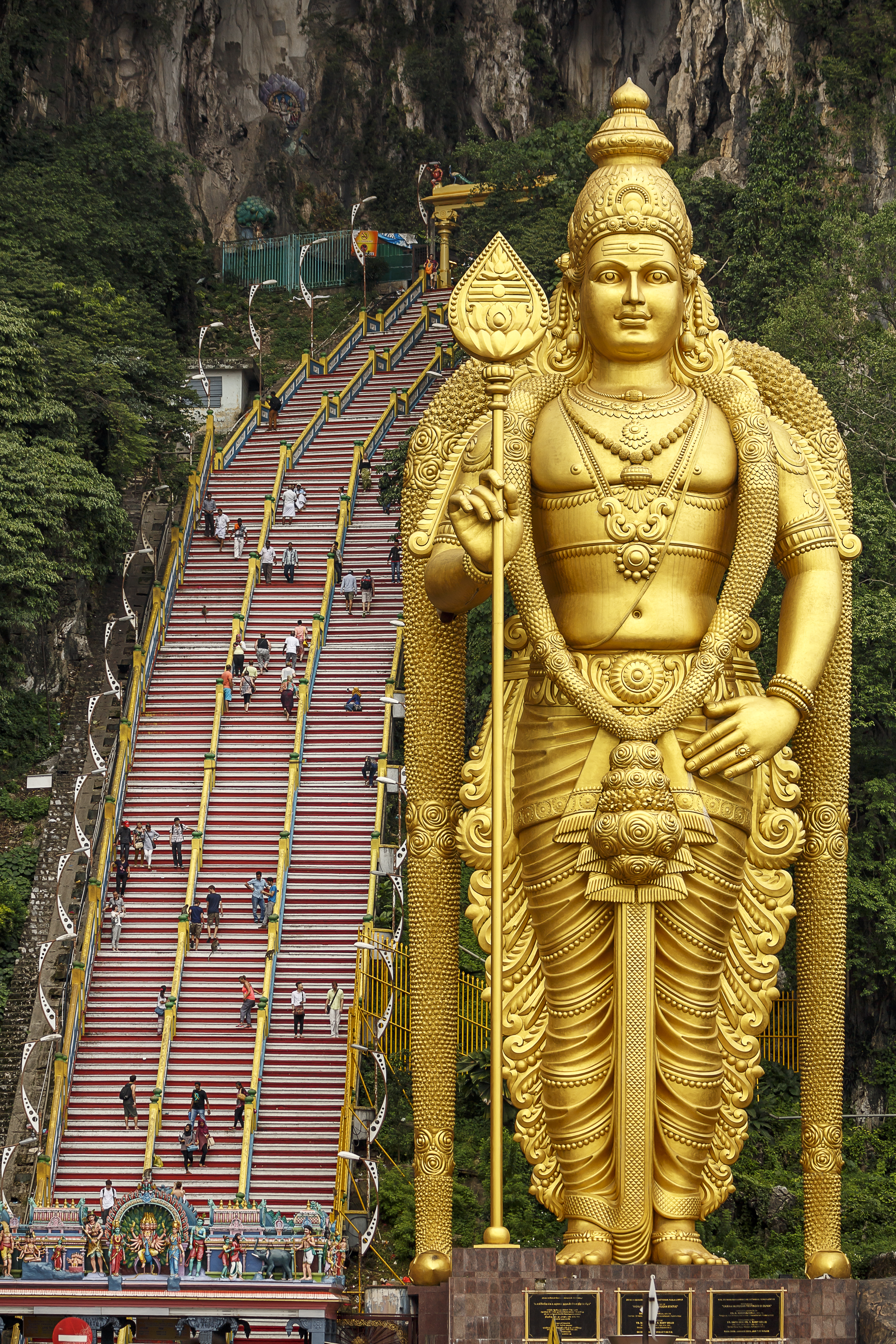
Standing at 42.7 meter (140.09 ft) high, the Kartikeya statue, is Malaysia's tallest statue, a Hindu deity, is located outside Batu Caves, Selangor near the city of Kuala Lumpur, Malaysia.

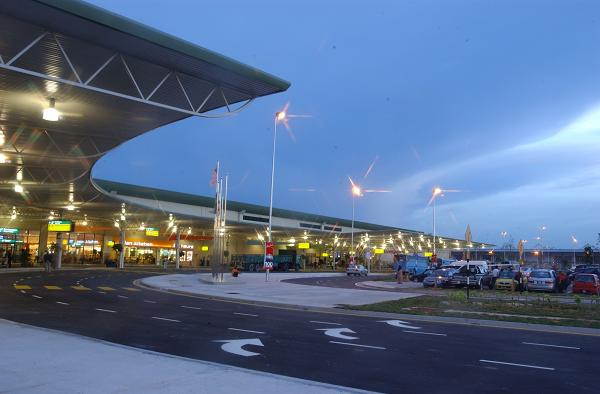
KLIA's Low Cost Carrier Terminal

The new flag of the Federal Territory.

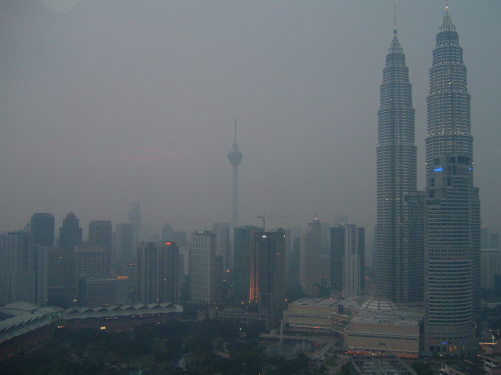
The business district of Kuala Lumpur in the evening of 29 September 2006 during 2006 Southeast Asian haze. Kuala Lumpur Tower and Petronas Twin Towers was barely visible. The average API for that day was in between 70 and 80.

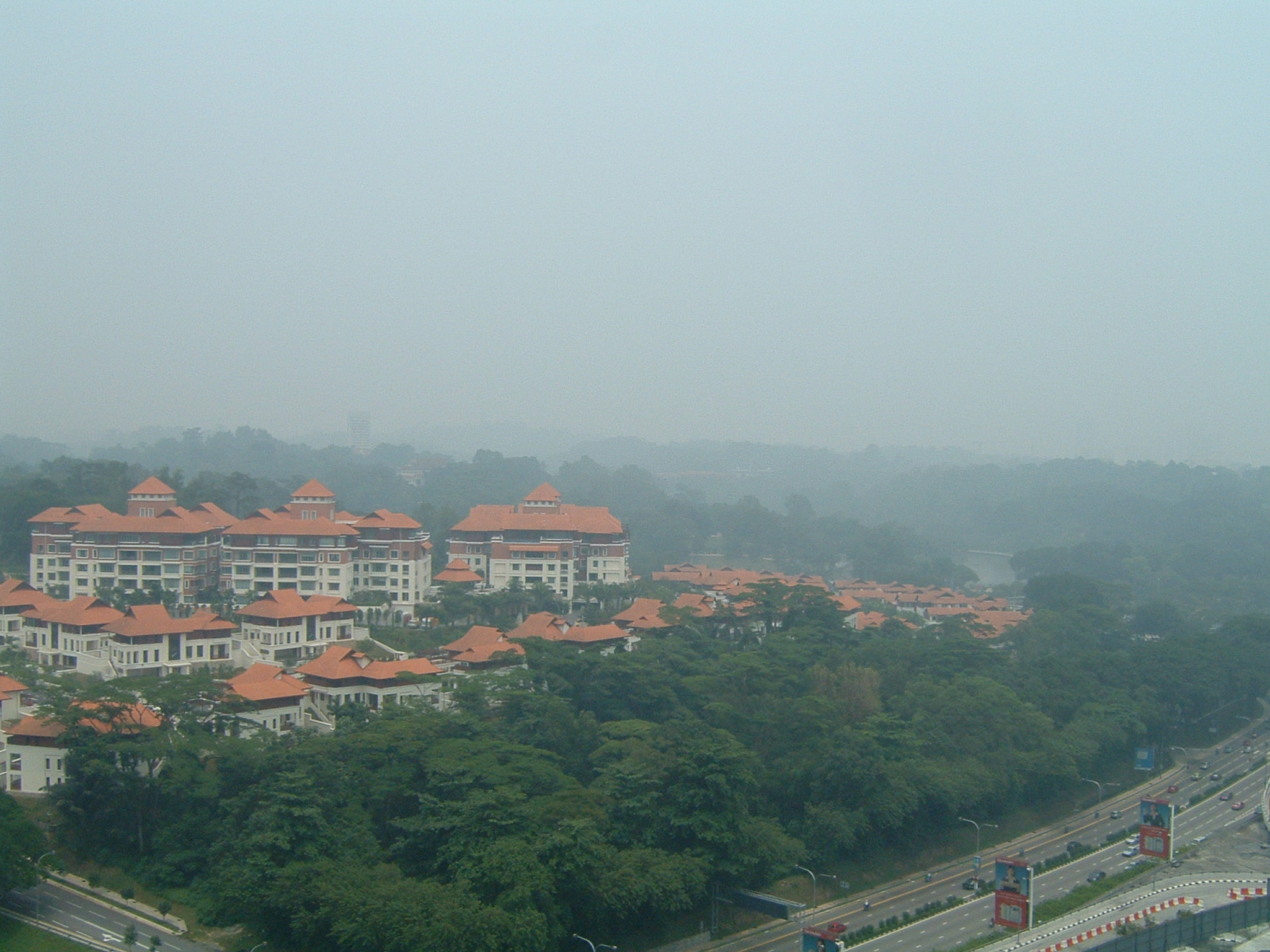
Overlooking the Perdana Lake Gardens in Kuala Lumpur at noon of 16 October 2006. The API read 76 at 11 AM. On a clear day, the Parliament and the National Monument would be visible on the horizon.

Similar shot on the morning of 2 November 2006. Notice the Parliament, the National Monument and the mountains.

Image of MEASAT-3 orbiting over Malaysia

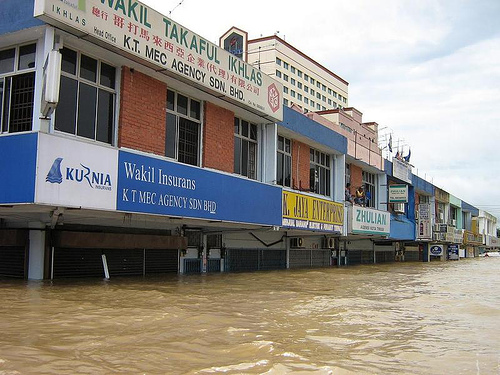
Kota Tinggi town during 2006–2007 flash floods in Kota Tinggi, Johor.

== Incumbent political figures ==
=== Federal level ===
- Yang di-Pertuan Agong:
  - Tuanku Syed Sirajuddin of Perlis (until 12 December)
  - Sultan Mizan Zainal Abidin of Terengganu (from 13 December)
- Raja Permaisuri Agong:
  - Tengku Fauziah of Perlis (until 12 December)
  - Sultanah Nur Zahirah of Terengganu (from 13 December)
- Deputy Yang di-Pertuan Agong:
  - Sultan Mizan Zainal Abidin of Terengganu (until 12 December)
  - Sultan Abdul Halim Mu'adzam Shah of Kedah (from 13 December)
- Prime Minister: Tun Abdullah Ahmad Badawi
- Deputy Prime Minister: Dato' Sri Mohammad Najib Abdul Razak
- President of the Dewan Negara: Tan Sri Dato' Seri Dr. Abdul Hamid Pawanteh
- Speaker of the Dewan Rakyat: Tan Sri Dato' Seri Diraja Ramli Ngah Talib
- Chief Justice: Ahmad Fairuz Abdul Halim

=== State level ===
- Johor:
  - Sultan of Johor: Sultan Iskandar
  - Menteri Besar of Johor: Abdul Ghani Othman
- Kedah:
  - Sultan of Kedah: Sultan Abdul Halim Mu'adzam Shah
  - Menteri Besar of Kedah: Mahdzir Khalid
- Kelantan:
  - Sultan of Kelantan: Sultan Ismail Petra
  - Menteri Besar of Kelantan: Nik Abdul Aziz Nik Mat
- Perlis:
  - Raja of Perlis: Tuanku Syed Faizuddin Putra (Regent until 12 December)
  - Menteri Besar of Perlis: Shahidan Kassim
- Perak:
  - Sultan of Perak: Sultan Azlan Muhibbuddin Shah
  - Menteri Besar of Perak: Tajol Rosli Mohd Ghazali
- Pahang:
  - Sultan of Pahang: Sultan Haji Ahmad Shah Al-Musta'in Billah
  - Menteri Besar of Pahang: Adnan Yaakob
- Selangor:
  - Sultan of Selangor: Sultan Sharafuddin Idris Shah
  - Menteri Besar of Selangor: Mohamad Khir Toyo
- Terengganu:
  - Sultan of Terengganu: Tengku Muhammad Ismail (Regent from 13 December)
  - Menteri Besar of Terengganu: Idris Jusoh
- Negeri Sembilan:
  - Yang di-Pertuan Besar of Negeri Sembilan: Tuanku Ja'afar
  - Menteri Besar of Negeri Sembilan: Mohamad Hasan
- Penang:
  - Governor of Penang: Tun Abdul Rahman Abbas
  - Chief Minister of Penang: Koh Tsu Koon
- Malacca:
  - Governor of Malacca: Tun Mohd Khalid Yaakob
  - Chief Minister of Malacca: Mohd Ali Rustam
- Sarawak:
  - Governor of Sarawak: Tun Abang Muhammad Salahuddin
  - Chief Minister of Sarawak: Abdul Taib Mahmud
- Sabah:
  - Governor of Sabah: Tun Ahmadshah Abdullah
  - Chief Minister of Sabah: Musa Aman

== Events ==
- 29 January – Tallest Lord Muruga statue in the world was unveiled at Batu Caves, Selangor and Sri Batumalai Murugan Temple was opened to pilgrims.
- 4 February – The Kepong Flyover on the Kuala Lumpur Middle Ring Road 2 (MRR2) was closed to traffic for repair works. It reopened in December.
- 18 February – The Federal Court unanimously decided that the Ampang Jaya Municipal Council (MPAJ), the Gombak District Council (MDG) or any local government had immunity and was protected under Section 95 (2) of the Road, Drainage and Building Act 1974 from any claim before the collapse of the Highland Towers apartment block. Tan Sri Steve Shim Lip Kiong, Datuk Abdul Hamid Mohamad and Datuk Arifin Zakaria decided that MPAJ was not responsible for losses before and after the condominium collapsed.
- 27 February – Shah Alam, Selangor's state capital was hit by massive flash floods.
- 15–26 March – Malaysia at the 2006 Commonwealth Games in Melbourne, Australia.
- 23 March – The LCCT, Malaysia's first budget air terminal in Sepang, Selangor was opened.
- 12 Aprill – Construction of the new Tanjung Puteri road bridge replacing the Malaysian side of the causeway was canceled.
- 23 April – Tun Abdul Ghafar Baba, former deputy prime minister died. He was laid to rest at Makam Pahlawan, near Masjid Negara, Kuala Lumpur.
- 20 May – SUPP experienced its worst defeat since its establishment in 1959, winning only 11 out of 19 contested seats in the Sarawak elections.
- 23 May – A unified flag collectively representing all three Federal Territories of Malaysia: Kuala Lumpur, Labuan and Putrajaya was unveiled.
- 28 May – 4 June — 2006 Sukma Games in Kedah.
  - A unified Federal Territories delegation contested for the first time under the new flag. These games were also the last appearances for the Royal Malaysian Police delegation.
- 31 May – Four people were killed in the landslide in Kampung Pasir, Ulu Klang, Selangor.
- 9–13 June — 2006 Malaysian Paralympiad in Kuala Lumpur.
- 20 June – Petaling Jaya was granted city status, becoming the second municipality in Selangor with city rights after the state capital Shah Alam.
- 4 July – 2006 Southeast Asian haze
  - The effects of the haze started in early July and affected the northern Malaysian states severely.
- 25 July – Tengku Datuk Puteri Kamariah Sultan Abu Bakar, sister of Sultan Ahmad Shah of Pahang was stabbed to death by her 21-year-old son Tunku Rizal Shahzan Tunku Ismail.
- 30 July
  - Eleven passengers were killed in a bus crash near the Jawi Interchange, Penang, on the North–South Expressway.
  - The South Johor Economic Region (SJER) was announced.
- 30 July – 2006 Penang Bridge International Marathon.
- August – The Malaysian federal government unveiled plans to build the Penang Second Bridge in the Ninth Malaysia Plan.
- 12 August — Maju Dan Sejahtera was adopted as the anthem of the Federal Territories.
- 20 August – The Flag of the Federal Territories was launched together with the territorial anthem, Maju dan Sejahtera by the King of Malaysia.
- 21 August – Malaysian pop singer Siti Nurhaliza married Datuk Khalid Mohd Jiwa (Datuk K).
- 29 August – 2006 Southeast Asian haze
  - However, the haze had cleared substantially throughout Peninsular Malaysia from 29 August 2006 due to the arrival of the rainy season. The rain reduced the number of hotspots throughout Sumatra and the Malay Peninsula.
- 30 August – 2006 Southeast Asian haze
  - The Star reported that Kuala Lumpur would be free of haze during the Independence Day. In the late evening just before midnight on 31 August 2006, the visibility in the Klang Valley was recorded to be very good.
- 4 September – Sheikh Muszaphar Shukor and Faiz Khaleed were announced as the first Malaysian angkasawan (cosmonauts).
- 7 September – The remains of two 19th-century Malay warriors Ngah Ibrahim and Laksamana Mohammad Amin Alang Duakap were brought back from Singapore to Perak.
- 22 September – Suki won One in a Million, a popular singing competition which offers prizes up to RM 1,000,000.
- August–October – 2006 Southeast Asian haze.
  - Mongolian model, Altantuya Shaaribuu was murdered in Shah Alam, Selangor.
- 3 October – 2006 Southeast Asian haze
  - Unfortunately, the haze returned again in late September when Muslim Malaysians were experiencing Ramadan. This was partly due to a change of wind direction towards the southwest, partially caused by Typhoon Xangsane.
- 5 October – 2006 Southeast Asian haze
  - Unfortunately, The worst hit place was Kuching. The Sarawak state government had declared that schools would close if the API breaches the 300 mark.
- 7–8 October – 2006 Southeast Asian haze
  - The winds has changed direction and started to blow the hazes away from Malaysia, and the following day, heavy rain has cleared the haze.
  - The worst affected area in Peninsular Malaysia is Johor Bahru which recorded an API of 150 on 7 and 8 October. For now, many people are wearing masks to prevent themselves from inhaling excessive amounts of haze.
  - Visibility in parts of East Malaysia fell to 300 metres.
- 9 October – 2006 Southeast Asian haze
  - The worst of the haze in Peninsular seemed to be in the state of Negeri Sembilan, where visibility in Sepang fell briefly to 500 metres and the API in Nilai reached 198, before the rain relieved the haze partially. Shortly thereafter changing winds caused conditions to improve rapidly. Sarawak has started cloud seeding attempts to try to encourage rainfall that will help relieve the haze. Each cloud seeding session costs at least RM50,000 (roughly US$14,000).
- 21 October – 2006 Southeast Asian haze
  - The winds has changed direction and started to blow the hazes away from Malaysia, and the following day, heavy rain has cleared the haze.
- 26 October – 2006 Southeast Asian haze
  - The heavy rain returned again, and there were isolated showers in Klang Valley. The Star reported that the hazy days are soon coming to an end as the monsoon season is approaching.

- 27 October – A six-coach train of the Ampang Line LRT overshot the end of the elevated tracks at Sentul Timur station, resulting in the front half of the first coach dangling in the air about 25 meters above the ground.
- November – Heavy showers hit Peninsular Malaysia daily for several weeks, unusual even during the rainy season in previous years.
- 4 November – The South Johor Economic Region (SJER) was officially named as Iskandar Development Region.
- 7 November – The KLCI passed the 1,000 mark hurdle, for the first time since 2000.
- 12 November – Ground-breaking ceremony for the new Sultan Abdul Halim Muadzam Shah Bridge.
- 20 November – Microchips worth millions of ringgit were stolen from the Air Cargo Complex in Batu Maung, Penang.
- 25 November–1 December – The 2006 FESPIC Games took place in Kuala Lumpur with 3,641 athletes from 46 nations competing. Malaysia rank at fourth place with total 175 medals. This was the last FESPIC Games event held before many Asian countries competed in the first 2010 Asian Para Games.
- 1–15 December — Malaysia at the 2006 Asian Games in Doha, Qatar.
- 7 December – The Klang Valley metropolitan area was given MSC status by Prime Minister Abdullah Ahmad Badawi.
- 7 December – Cicak Man, Malaysia's locally produced superhero film, hit the screens.
- 12 December – The MEASAT III was launched by a Proton rocket from Baikonur Cosmodrome, Kazakhstan.
- 13 December – Sultan Mizan Zainal Abidin of Terengganu replaced Tuanku Syed Sirajuddin of Perlis as the 13th Yang di-Pertuan Agong.
- 15 December – Bok House, a 1920s bungalow along Jalan Ampang, Kuala Lumpur, was controversially demolished.
- 19 December – Several parts of Johor, Malacca and Pahang including Johor Bahru, Skudai, Segamat, Jasin and Kota Tinggi were hit by flash floods.

== National Day ==
=== Theme ===
Keranamu Malaysia: Misi Nasional, Penjaya Wawasan (Because of you, Malaysia: National Mission, Visionary Generator)

=== National Day parade ===
Merdeka Square, Kuching, Sarawak

== Births ==
- 27 January – Lauren Hoh Ruyi – footballer.

== Deaths ==
- 20 January – Rosiah Chik, Malay singer.
- 20 March – James Peter Ongkili, former Deputy Chief Minister of Sabah.
- 23 April – Tun Abdul Ghafar Baba, 6th Deputy Prime Minister of Malaysia.
- 25 July – Hani Mohsin, celebrity and the host of the TV gameshow Wheel of Fortune Malaysia version Roda Impian.
- 17 August – Tan Sri Kontik Kamariah Ahmad, first women in the co-operative movement, education and politics.
- 1 September – Rashid Maidin, senior leader and member of the Central Committee of the Communist Party of Malaya.
- 19 November – Tan Sri Mohamed Khir Johari, former Minister of Education.

== See also ==
- 2006
- 2005 in Malaysia | 2007 in Malaysia
- History of Malaysia
- List of Malaysian films of 2006
