= 2004 in Malaysia =

- Decades: 1980s; 1990s; 2000s; 2010s; 2020s
- See also: Other events of 2004; History of Malaysia • Timeline • Years

This article lists important figures and events in Malaysian public affairs during the year 2004, together with births and deaths of notable Malaysians. 2004 marked is 47th anniversary of Malaysia's Independence.

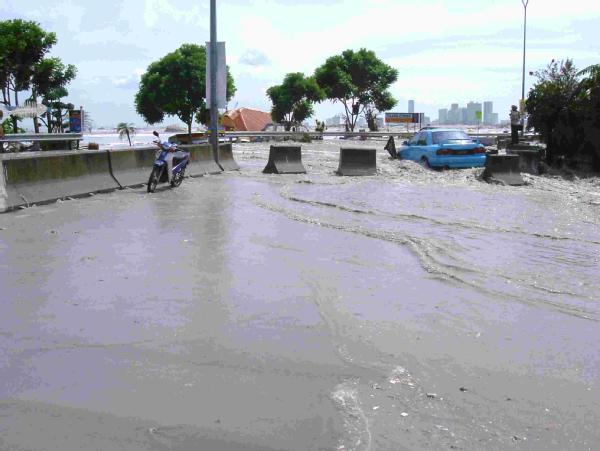
The 2004 Indian Ocean earthquake and tsunami disaster at Tanjung Tokong, Penang.

== Incumbent political figures ==
=== Federal level ===
- Yang di-Pertuan Agong: Tuanku Syed Sirajuddin of Perlis
- Raja Permaisuri Agong: Tengku Fauziah of Perlis
- Deputy Yang di-Pertuan Agong: Sultan Mizan Zainal Abidin of Terengganu
- Prime Minister: Tun Abdullah Ahmad Badawi
- Deputy Prime Minister: Dato' Sri Mohammad Najib Abdul Razak (from 7 January)
- President of the Dewan Negara: Tan Sri Dato' Seri Dr. Abdul Hamid Pawanteh
- Speaker of the Dewan Rakyat:
  - Tun Dr. Mohamed Zahir Ismail (until 14 October)
  - Tan Sri Dato' Seri Diraja Ramli Ngah Talib (from 22 November)
- Chief Justice: Ahmad Fairuz Abdul Halim

=== State level ===
- Johor:
  - Sultan of Johor: Sultan Iskandar
  - Menteri Besar of Johor: Abdul Ghani Othman
- Kedah:
  - Sultan of Kedah: Sultan Abdul Halim Mu'adzam Shah
  - Menteri Besar of Kedah: Syed Razak Syed Zain Barakbah
- Kelantan:
  - Sultan of Kelantan: Sultan Ismail Petra
  - Menteri Besar of Kelantan: Nik Abdul Aziz Nik Mat
- Perlis:
  - Raja of Perlis: Tuanku Syed Faizuddin Putra (Regent)
  - Menteri Besar of Perlis: Shahidan Kassim
- Perak:
  - Sultan of Perak: Sultan Azlan Muhibbuddin Shah
  - Menteri Besar of Perak: Tajol Rosli Mohd Ghazali
- Pahang:
  - Sultan of Pahang: Sultan Haji Ahmad Shah Al-Musta'in Billah
  - Menteri Besar of Pahang: Adnan Yaakob
- Selangor:
  - Sultan of Selangor: Sultan Sharafuddin Idris Shah
  - Menteri Besar of Selangor: Mohamad Khir Toyo
- Terengganu:
  - Sultan of Terengganu: Sultan Mizan Zainal Abidin
  - Menteri Besar of Terengganu:
    - Abdul Hadi Awang (until 25 March)
    - Idris Jusoh (from 25 March)
- Negeri Sembilan:
  - Yang di-Pertuan Besar of Negeri Sembilan: Tuanku Ja'afar
  - Menteri Besar of Negeri Sembilan:
    - Mohd Isa Abdul Samad (until 24 March)
    - Mohamad Hasan (from 25 March)
- Penang:
  - Governor of Penang: Tun Abdul Rahman Abbas
  - Chief Minister of Penang: Koh Tsu Koon
- Malacca:
  - Governor of Malacca:
    - Tun Syed Ahmad Syed Mahmud Shahabuddin (until 3 June)
    - Tun Mohd Khalid Yaakob (from 4 June)
  - Chief Minister of Malacca: Mohd Ali Rustam
- Sarawak:
  - Governor of Sarawak: Tun Abang Muhammad Salahuddin
  - Chief Minister of Sarawak: Abdul Taib Mahmud
- Sabah:
  - Governor of Sabah: Tun Ahmadshah Abdullah
  - Chief Minister of Sabah: Musa Aman

== Events ==
- January – Islam Hadhari was introduced by the federal government.
- 7 January – Mohammad Najib Abdul Razak was appointed Deputy Prime Minister of Malaysia.
- 16 January – A 10-year-old girl Nurul Huda Abdul Ghani was raped and murdered at Tenaga Nasional's Tanjung Pelepas intake, Johor.
- 2 February – Kailan Hassan, the mother of incumbent Malaysian Prime Minister Abdullah Ahmad Badawi died.
- 15 February – The pilot batch of Malaysia's first National Service program began their training at various camps across Malaysia. Two additional batches joined the program in mid-March.
- 4 March – Malaysian Institute of Integrity was established.
- 21 March – The 2004 Malaysian general election. Barisan Nasional coalition won a landslide majority and retook Terengganu from the PAS.
- 23 April – National Integrity Plan was launched.
- May – Two students from Universiti Teknologi MARA (UiTM), Muhammad Muqharabbin Mokhtarruddin and Ahmad Redzuan Rozal were the first tertiary students from Southeast Asia to reach the peak of Mount Everest.
- 29 May – 6 June – 2004 Sukma Games in Negeri Sembilan.
- June – The first polymer notes of Malaysian ringgit RM 5 were introduced.
- 1 June – AmFinance Bhd agreed to pay RM52 million to 139 plaintiffs in the lawsuit over the Highland Towers collapse led by Dr Benjamin George.
- July – RapidKL bus and transit service was launched.
- 1 July – The electronic payment system, Touch 'n Go and Smart TAG, were made compulsory in all Malaysians expressways.
- August – Opening of the East Coast Expressway (Phase 1 = Pahang state) from Karak to Kuantan.
- 13–29 August – Malaysia at the 2004 Summer Olympics in Athens, Greece.
- 31 August – "Puteri Gunung Ledang" (Princess of Mount Ledang (Ophir)) hit the screens.
- 2 September – Dato' Seri Anwar Ibrahim, the former Deputy Prime Minister, was released after serving six years in prison. He would later lead the opposition party PKR.
- 17–28 September — Malaysia at the 2004 Summer Paralympics in Athens, Greece.
- 12 October – A landslide occurred on the North–South Expressway near Gua Tempurung, Perak.
- November – Syarikat Prasarana Negara Berhad (SPNB) handed over the operations of the LRT and bus services to Rapid KL.
- 29 November – 4 December – Malaysia at the 2004 Commonwealth Youth Games in Bendigo, Australia.
- 30 November – Sharifah Mazlina Syed Abdul Kadir became the first Asian woman to ski-sail across Antarctica.
- 26 December – The 2004 Indian Ocean earthquake and tsunami killed about 130,000 people including more than 70 Malaysians. The tsunami was observed in Kedah, Penang and Perak.

== National Day ==
=== Theme ===
Keranamu Malaysia (Because of you, Malaysia)

=== National Day parade ===
Kemunting Square, Kuantan, Pahang

== Births ==
- 20 January – Lorenzo Irmann – Actor.
- 2 February – Lovelly Anne Robberth – Karateka.
- 12 February – Shania Hendrik – Actress.
- 14 February – Aruwin Salehhuddin – Alpine ski racer.
- 24 March – Sophia Zuhri – Singer.
- 29 March – Mohamad Syahmi – Weightlifter
- 31 March
  - Redzwan Adha – Actor.
  - Putri Jannah Izwandy – Actress.
- 1 April – Justin Hoh – Badminton player.
- 22 April – Fikry Kiki – Singer, Actor, and TV Host.
- 5 May – Aqeesh Aleeya – Singer, Actress.
- 4 June – Zarif Ghazzi – Actor.
- 22 July – Niathalia Sherawinnie Yampil – Karateka.
- 5 August – Amanda Yap Hwa Leng – Badminton player.
- 1 September — Siti Nurshuhaini — Badminton player.
- 9 September – Muhammad Aiqal Asmadie – Karateka.
- 13 October – Wong Zi Hong – Wushu athlete.
- 25 October – Danish Iskandar – Actor.
- 10 December – Muhammad Hafizuddin Roslin – Weightlifter.
- 15 December –
  - Fang Ze Zeng – Figure skater
  - Qistina Khaled – Actress, singer.

== Deaths ==
- 21 February – Khoo Teck Puat – Business tycoon and founder of Maybank.
- 14 July – Tun Azizan Zainul Abidin – Corporate figure and President of Putrajaya Corporation and Petronas.
- 14 October – Tun Mohamed Zahir Ismail – Speaker of the Dewan Rakyat.

== See also ==
- 2004
- 2003 in Malaysia | 2005 in Malaysia
- History of Malaysia
- List of Malaysian films of 2004
