= 2007 in Malaysia =

- Decades: 1980s; 1990s; 2000s; 2010s; 2020s
- See also: Other events of 2007; History of Malaysia • Timeline • Years

Visit Malaysia Year 2007 official logo

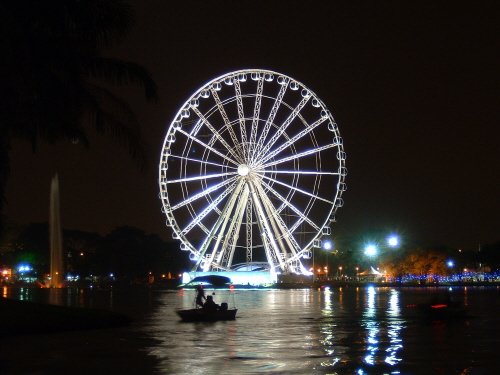
The Eye on Malaysia Ferris wheel

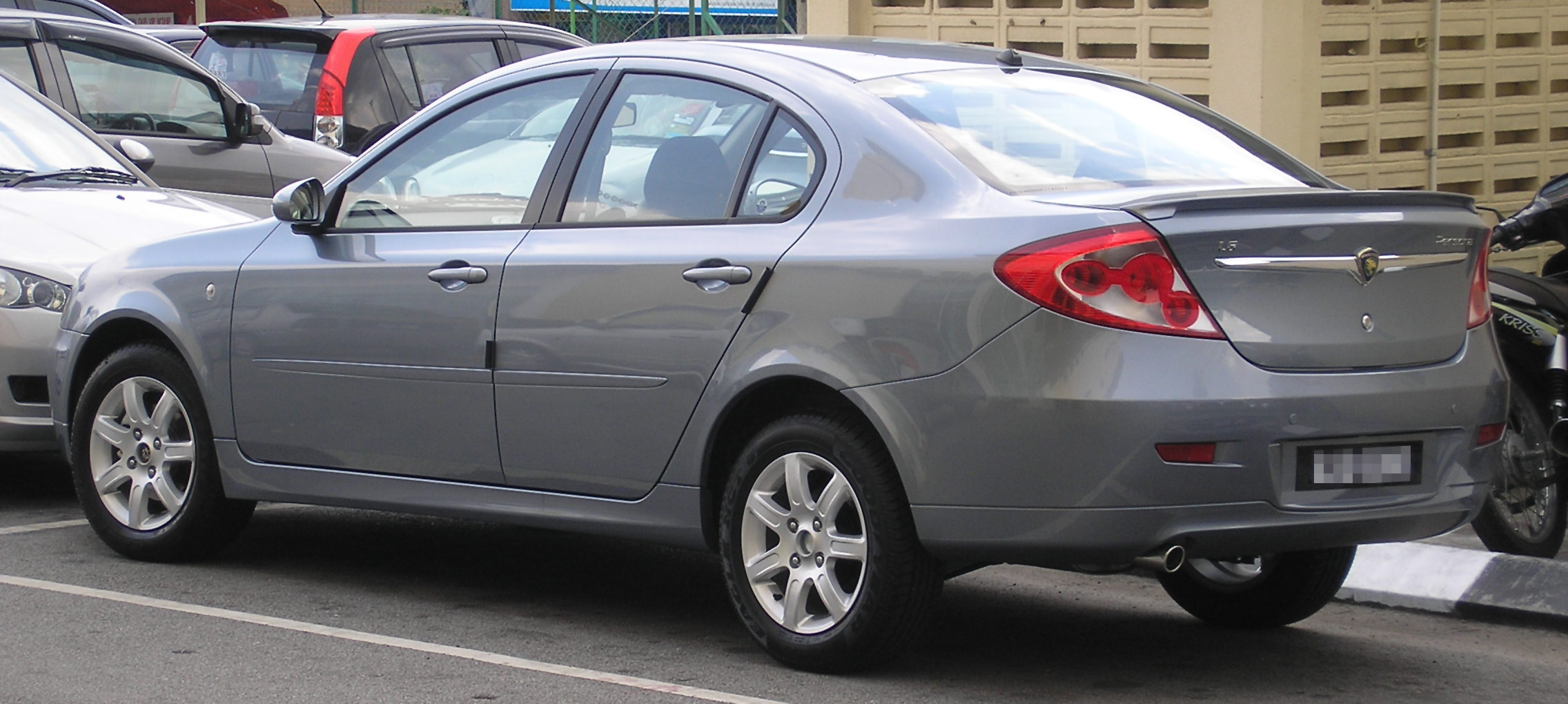
Proton Persona

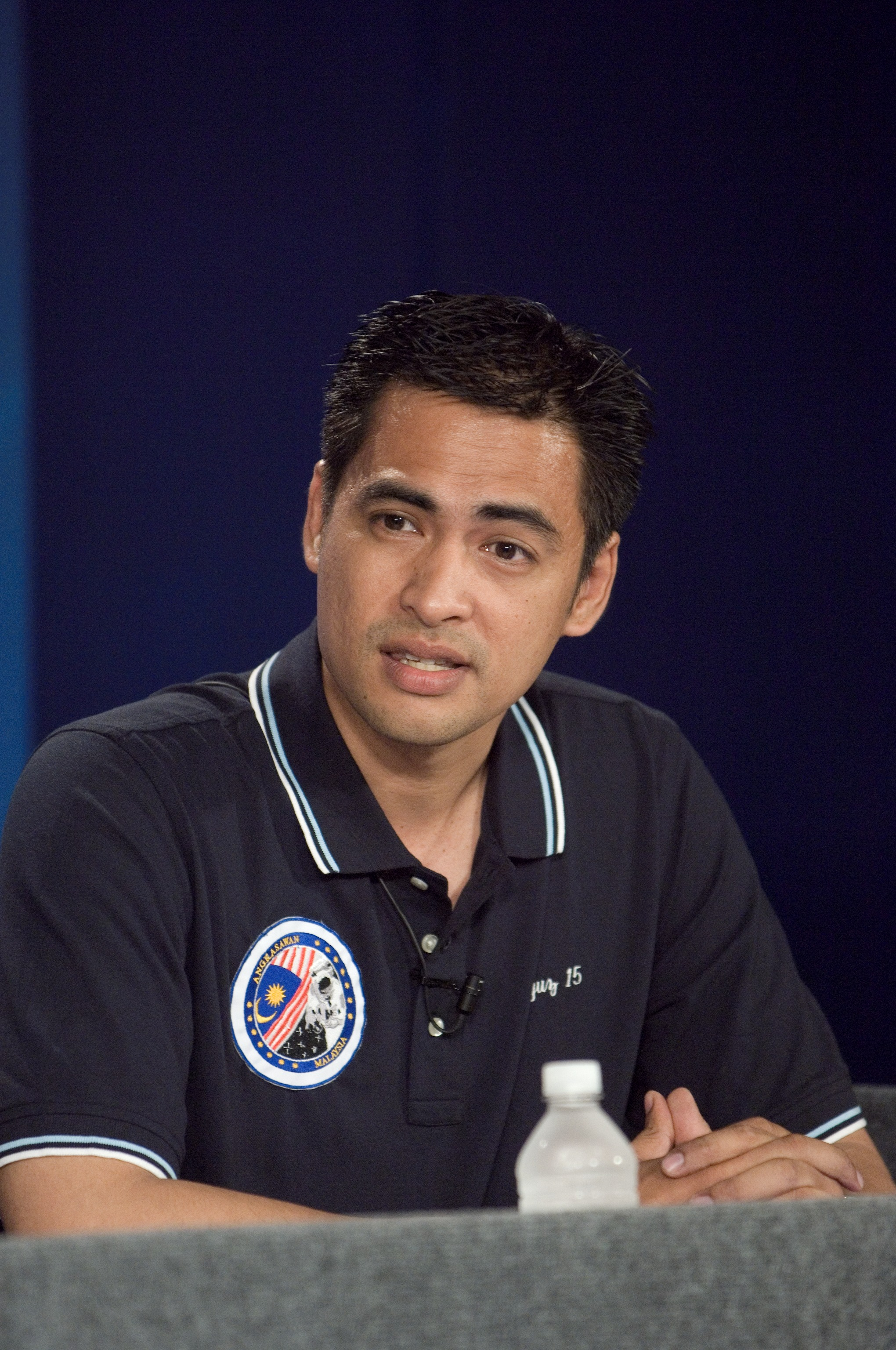
Sheikh Muszaphar Shukor, Malaysia's first angkasawan (astronaut).

This article lists important figures and events in Malaysian public affairs during the year 2007, together with births and deaths of notable Malaysians. 2007 marked is 50th anniversary of Malaysia's Independence.

== Incumbent political figures ==
=== Federal level ===
- Yang di-Pertuan Agong: Sultan Mizan Zainal Abidin of Terengganu
- Raja Permaisuri Agong: Sultanah Nur Zahirah of Terengganu
- Deputy Yang di-Pertuan Agong: Sultan Abdul Halim Mu'adzam Shah of Kedah
- Prime Minister: Abdullah Ahmad Badawi
- Deputy Prime Minister: Mohammad Najib Abdul Razak
- President of the Dewan Negara: Tan Sri Dato' Seri Dr. Abdul Hamid Pawanteh
- Speaker of the Dewan Rakyat: Tan Sri Dato' Seri Diraja Ramli Ngah Talib
- Chief Justice:
  - Ahmad Fairuz Abdul Halim (until 31 October)
  - Abdul Hamid Mohamad (from 2 November)

=== State level ===
- Johor:
  - Sultan of Johor: Sultan Iskandar
  - Menteri Besar of Johor: Abdul Ghani Othman
- Kedah:
  - Sultan of Kedah: Sultan Abdul Halim Mu'adzam Shah
  - Menteri Besar of Kedah: Mahdzir Khalid
- Kelantan:
  - Sultan of Kelantan: Sultan Ismail Petra
  - Menteri Besar of Kelantan: Nik Abdul Aziz Nik Mat
- Perlis:
  - Raja of Perlis: Tuanku Syed Sirajuddin
  - Menteri Besar of Perlis: Shahidan Kassim
- Perak:
  - Sultan of Perak: Sultan Azlan Muhibbuddin Shah
  - Menteri Besar of Perak: Tajol Rosli Mohd Ghazali
- Pahang:
  - Sultan of Pahang: Sultan Haji Ahmad Shah Al-Musta'in Billah
  - Menteri Besar of Pahang: Adnan Yaakob
- Selangor:
  - Sultan of Selangor: Sultan Sharafuddin Idris Shah
  - Menteri Besar of Selangor: Mohamad Khir Toyo
- Terengganu:
  - Sultan of Terengganu: Tengku Muhammad Ismail (Regent)
  - Menteri Besar of Terengganu: Idris Jusoh
- Negeri Sembilan:
  - Yang di-Pertuan Besar of Negeri Sembilan: Tuanku Ja'afar
  - Menteri Besar of Negeri Sembilan: Mohamad Hasan
- Penang:
  - Governor of Penang: Tun Abdul Rahman Abbas
  - Chief Minister of Penang: Koh Tsu Koon
- Malacca:
  - Governor of Malacca: Tun Mohd Khalid Yaakob
  - Chief Minister of Malacca: Mohd Ali Rustam
- Sarawak:
  - Governor of Sarawak: Tun Abang Muhammad Salahuddin
  - Chief Minister of Sarawak: Abdul Taib Mahmud
- Sabah:
  - Governor of Sabah: Tun Ahmadshah Abdullah
  - Chief Minister of Sabah: Musa Aman

== Events ==
=== January ===
- 1 January – Visit Malaysia Year 2007 officially began.
- 6 January – The opening ceremony for the Visit Malaysia Year 2007 and the Eye on Malaysia ferris wheel was held at the Titiwangsa Lake Gardens, Kuala Lumpur.
- 9 January – A landslide in Sandakan, Sabah.
- 10 January – Several parts of Johor were hit by 2006–2007 flash floods again.
- 18 January –Bloggers Jeff Ooi and Ahirudin Attan were sued by the New Straits Times Press (NSTP) for libel.
- 28 January – Barisan Nasional won a 2007 Batu Talam by-election in Batu Talam, Raub, Pahang.

=== February ===
- February – The El Nino phenomenon began.
- 2 February – The KLCI passed the 1,200 mark.
- 4 February – Bosnian groups have nominated former prime minister Mahathir Mohamad for the 2007 Nobel Peace Prize for helping the country after its bloody civil war.
- 7 February – The PEMUDAH was launched.
- 23 February – Iskandar Puteri, a planned city in the western part of SJER was launched.
- 24 February – Malaysia's world smallest microchip with radio technology was launched.
- 27 February – The KLCI fell 35.79 points from a high of 1272.87 after the global market suffered losses amid fears of capital control. The index continued to plunge 72.40 points for the next three days, to 1,164.68 points, as of 2 March. The index regained its lost points in April 2007.

=== March ===
- 9 March – Six passengers were killed in a bus crash near the Menora Tunnel of the PLUS Expressway around Kuala Kangsar, Perak.
- 25 March – The Royal Malaysian Police celebrated its 200th anniversary.

=== April ===
- 2 April – Firefly, Malaysia's second low-cost carrier and a subsidiary of flag carrier Malaysia Airlines, commenced operations.
- 4 April – A bomb hoax at the Penang Bridge led to its closure for more than two hours.
- 6–8 April – Petronas Formula One Malaysian Grand Prix 2007
- 8 April – Gerakan's party president Lim Keng Yaik retired.
- 12 April – Barisan Nasional's (BN) candidate Lai Meng Chong won the 2007 Machap by-election in Machap, Alor Gajah, Malacca, albeit with a reduced majority of 4,065 votes.
- 15 April – An UMNO Youth (Pemuda UMNO) parachute team landed at the North Pole.
- 18 April – Opening of the Kuala Lumpur Courts Complex at Jalan Duta.
- 26 April – Sultan Mizan Zainal Abidin of Terengganu was installed as the 13th Yang di-Pertuan Agong.
- 28 April – Parthiban Karuppiah of Barisan Nasional won the 2007 Ijok by-election in Ijok, Kuala Selangor, Selangor with a majority of 1,850 votes.

=== May ===
- 14 May – The motorway tunnel of the SMART Tunnel opened.
- 17 May – Raja Muda Nazrin Shah of Perak married Zara Salim Davidson.
- 24 May – 18 Sukhoi Su-30MKM Flanker strike fighter jets were delivered to Royal Malaysian Air Force (RMAF).
- 28 May – Malaysia's first foreign immigration multipurpose card I-Kad was launched.
- 30 May
  - Eight family members were killed in a highway crash in North–South Expressway near Hutan Kampung toll plaza, Alor Setar, Kedah.
  - The Federal Court rejected Lina Joy's appeal to get the National Registration Department to remove the word Islam from her identity card.

=== June ===
- 4 June – The Altantuya Shaaribuu murder trial began.
- 9 June – Prime Minister Abdullah Ahmad Badawi married Jeanne Abdullah.
- 9 June – An instance of bird flu was detected in Paya Jaras, Sungai Buloh, Selangor.
- 10 June – Several areas in Kuala Lumpur were hit by flash floods.
- 23 June – The stormwater tunnel of the SMART Tunnel opened.
- 24 June — 2007 Penang Bridge International Marathon.
- 26 June – Tycoon Eric Chia was acquitted of committing a criminal breach of trust involving RM 76.4 million after 13 years.

=== July ===
- 6 July – The Companies Commission of Malaysia took four CTOS company officials to court for contravening the Companies Act 1965.
- 7 July – The construction of the Bukit Tagar Incinerator was cancelled.
- 7–29 July – Malaysia co-hosted the 2007 Asian Cup.
  - 10 July – Malaysia crashed in a 1–5 defeat to China during the first matches.
- 15 July – Tengku Mahkota of Pahang, Tengku Abdullah ibni Sultan Ahmad Shah resigned as the Football Association of Malaysia (FAM) Deputy President.
- 18 July – Six crew were killed when a RMAF S-61 Nuri helicopter crashed at Genting Sempah, Pahang.
- 30–31 July – Official launching of the Northern Corridor Economic Region (NCER)
- 31 July – The Rapid Penang bus service was launched.

=== August ===
- 1 August – The Malaysiaku Gemilang theme song was launched.
- August – The Stadium Merdeka was officially gazetted by the Ministry of Culture, Arts and Heritage (KeKKWa) as a national heritage and historical building.
- 5–19 August – Malaysia hosted the Champion Youth Cup Malaysia 2007.
- 11 August – The completion of upgrading works on the North–South Expressway, including:
  - Jelapang–Ipoh South non–stop straight route
  - Rawang–Slim River six–lane carriageway
  - Seremban–Ayer Keroh six–lane carriageway
- 13 August – 20 passengers were killed in a bus crash in the North–South Expressway near Bukit Gantang, Changkat Jering, Perak. It is one of the worst road accidents in Malaysian history.
- 13–19 August – 2007 BWF World Championships were held in Kuala Lumpur.
- 15 August – The Proton Persona sedan car was launched.
- 18–30 August – The first Malaysian International Fireworks Competition (MIFC 2007) was held in Putrajaya.
- 29 August – Malaysia won the 2007 Merdeka Cup, beating Myanmar 3–1.
- 31 August – Malaysia celebrated 50 anniversary of independence.

=== September ===
- 3 September – Radio24, the only 24-hour news and talk radio station in Malaysia was launched.
- 7 September – Tabling of Budget 2008 in Parliament.
- 7–9 September – The Kuala Lumpur International Tattoo 2007 was held in Merdeka Stadium, Kuala Lumpur.
- 9 September – Riots in Kuala Terengganu after a police crackdown on an opposition political rally.
- 12 September – The Penang Global City Centre project was officially launched.
- 21 September – Eight-year old Nurin Jazlin Jazimin, who was abducted on 20 August, was confirmed dead.
- 27 September – The Kajang–Seremban Highway bridge at Semenyih interchange collapsed onto the Kajang–Semenyih road.
- 28 September – State and federal officers raided a shop in Section 7, Shah Alam, where they arrested four men and one woman between the ages of 27 and 35 in connection with the murder of Nurin Jazlin Jazimin. The woman was released after questioning, while the men were remanded to police custody for seven days.

=== October ===
- 1 October – 999 became the sole emergency phone number, replacing 991 and 994.
- 4 October – "Mechanical heart girl" Tee Hui Yee successfully underwent a heart transplant at National Heart Institute (IJN), Kuala Lumpur.
- 10 October – The first Malaysian angkasawan (cosmonaut), Sheikh Muszaphar Shukor was launched towards the International Space Station (ISS) on board Soyuz TMA-11. He was the first Malaysian to go to space. He was launched at Baikonur Cosmodrome, Kazakhstan.
- 13 October – Four passengers were killed in a ferry tragedy near Tioman Island, Pahang.
- 21 October – Sheikh Muszaphar Shukor returns to Earth in a Soyuz TMA-10 capsule.
- 22 October – The second Malaysian angkasawan (cosmonaut), Dr Faiz Khaleed was promoted to Major by the Royal Malaysian Air Force.
- 23 October – Official launching of the first Malaysian Scorpène-class submarine, KD Tunku Abdul Rahman.
- 26 October – 3 November - Malaysia at the 2007 Asian Indoor Games in Macau, China.
- 30 October – Official launching of the East Coast Economic Region (ECER).

=== November ===
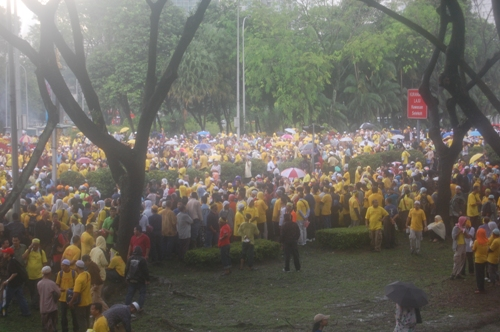
Rallying crowd in front of the Istana Negara during 2007 Bersih rally on 10 November.

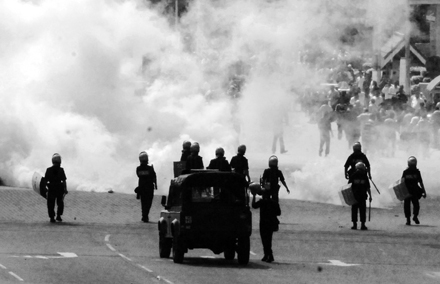
Riot police use teargas and water cannon to break up the HINDRAF supporters during an illegal gathering on 25 November.

- 2 November – AirAsia X launched its maiden flight from its base in Kuala Lumpur to Gold Coast, Australia.
- 10 November – More than 40,000 people in Kuala Lumpur participated in a peaceful rally against corruption in the electoral process in Malaysia.
- 14 November – The RM4.5 million Perak State Park Corporation's administrative building near Temenggor Lake collapsed.
- 20–22 November – Malaysian Independence Tennis Festival 2007:
  - 20 November – Clash of Titans: Rafael Nadal vs Richard Gasquet
  - 22 November – Clash of Times: Roger Federer vs Pete Sampras
- 25 November – More than 30,000 Hindu Rights Action Force supporters in Kuala Lumpur participated in an illegal gathering outside the British High Commission building.
- 27 November – The first made-in-Malaysia monorail, "Sutra" was launched.
- 28 November – Guthrie Berhad and Golden Hope merged into one giant plantations company, Sime Darby.
- 30 November – Malaysia's first portable computer, Makcik PC was introduced by MIMOS.

=== December ===
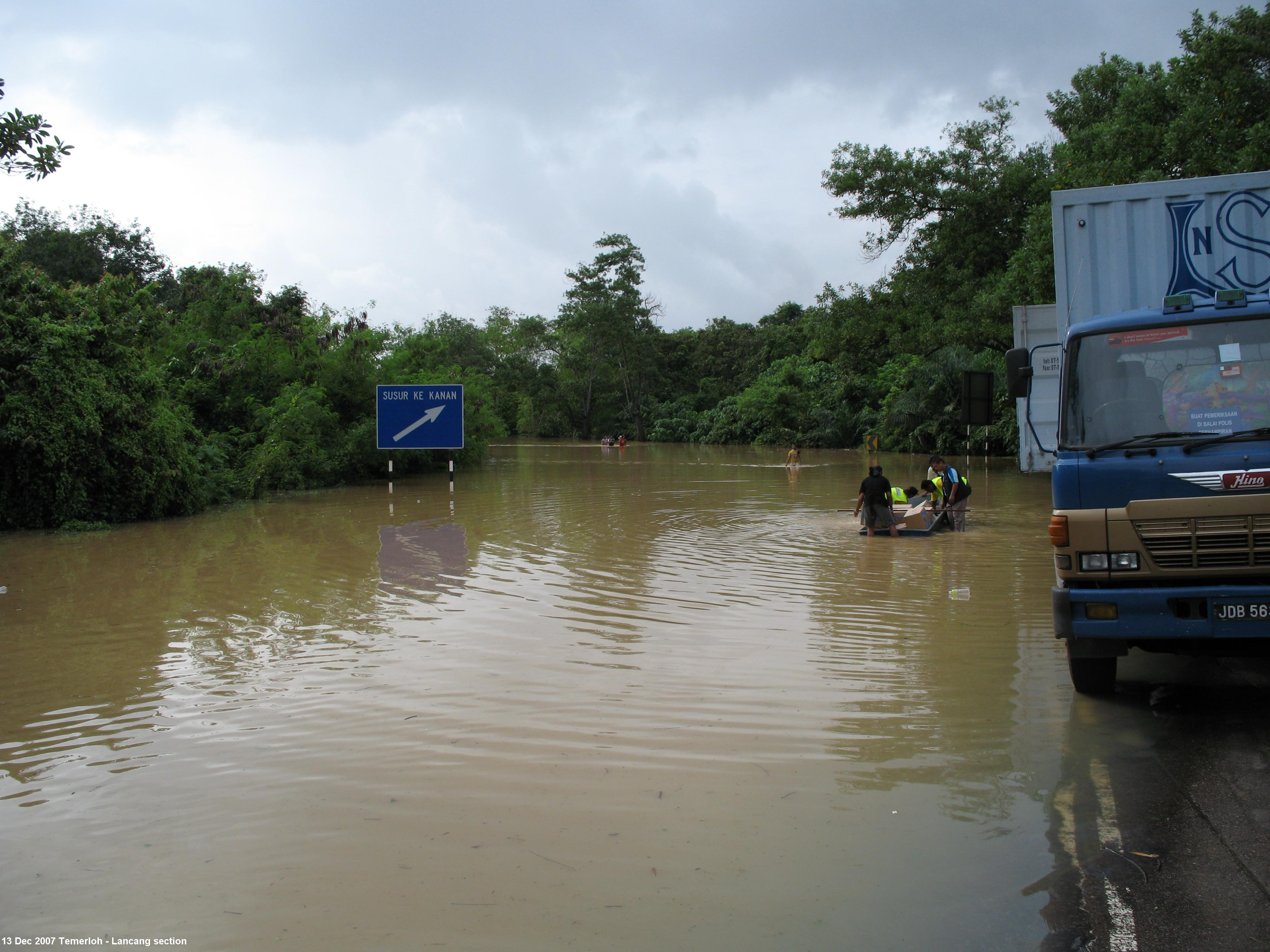
Flood scene on 13 December at the federal road between Temerloh and Lancang.

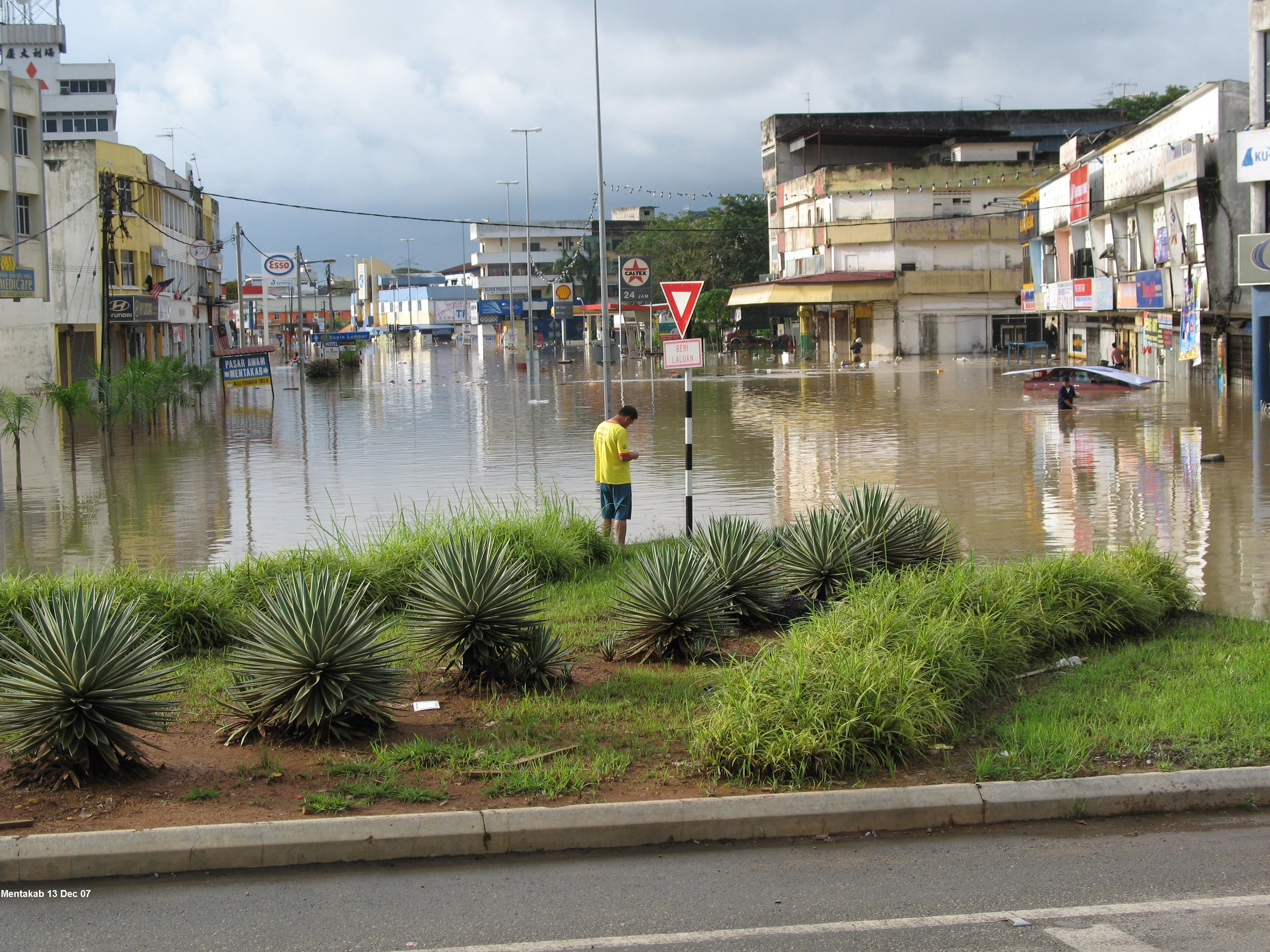
Flood scene on 13 December in Mentakab.

- 2 December – Three paratroopers were killed in an incident during a practice exercise of LIMA in Langkawi, Kedah.
- December – Several parts of the East Coast of Peninsular Malaysia, including Kelantan, Terengganu, Pahang and Johor were hit by flash floods.
- 8 December – Eight family members were killed in an accident at Gua Musang Highway near Gua Musang, Kelantan.
- 10 December – PAS vice-president Mohamad Sabu and PKR information chief Chua Tian Chang were among eight people arrested for alleged involvement in the BERSIH rally the previous month.
- 11 December – Seven people were killed and 28 were injured in a collision between an express bus and a latex tanker at the Jelapang toll plaza near Ipoh, Perak.
- 13 December – Five HINDRAF leaders including V. Ganabathirau (chief leader) were arrested under the Internal Security Act (ISA).
- 7–15 December – The Malaysian contingent earned 68 medals in the 2007 SEA Games at Nakhon Ratchasima, Thailand.
- 21 December – Opening of the Bukit Bunga–Ban Buketa Bridge of Malaysia–Thailand border in Kelantan.
- 26 December – Two villagers were buried alive in a major landslide, which destroyed nine wooden houses in Lorong 1, Kampung Baru Cina, Kapit, Sarawak.

== Independence/National Day ==
=== Theme ===
Malaysiaku Gemilang (My Glorious Malaysia)

=== National Day parade ===
Independence Square, Kuala Lumpur

== Births ==
- 14 November – Johan Ghazali – Kickboxer.

== Deaths ==
- 23 January – Syed Hussein Alatas, former politician, academic and founder of the Parti Gerakan Rakyat Malaysia.
- 15 March – Poh Ah Tiam, politician, senior Malaysian Chinese Association (MCA) official and state assemblyman for Machap, Malacca.
- 4 April – Sivalingam Arumugam, politician, State Executive Councillor of Selangor and state assemblyman for Ijok, Selangor.
- 1 June – Kasma Booty, Malay actress.
- 4 June – Loganathan Arumugam (Loga), member of the Alleycats band group.
- 3 August – Chong Ted Tsiung, 3rd Mayor of Kuching South…
- 16 September – Nurin Jazlin, murder victim.
- 27 September – Michael Chang Min Tat, Federal Court judge.
- 30 September – Lim Kean Siew, former political, lawyer and former chairman and Secretary-General of the Labour Party of Malaya.
- 23 October – Lim Goh Tong, founder and chairman of Genting Group (b. 1918)
- 27 October – Othman Saat, 11th Menteri Besar of Johor.

== See also ==
- 2007
- 2006 in Malaysia | 2008 in Malaysia
- History of Malaysia
- List of Malaysian films of 2007
