= 2005 in Malaysia =

- Decades: 1980s; 1990s; 2000s; 2010s; 2020s
- See also: Other events of 2005; History of Malaysia • Timeline • Years

This article lists important figures and events in Malaysian public affairs during the year 2005, together with births and deaths of notable Malaysians. 2005 marked is 48th anniversary of Malaysia's Independence.

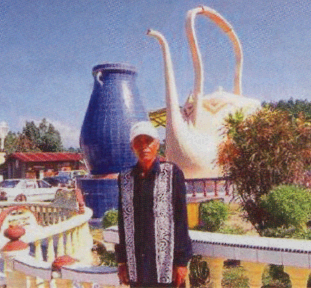
Ariffin Mohamed known as Ayah Pin standing in front of the large teapot and the vase in the Sky Kingdom compound prior to its demolition on 1 August.

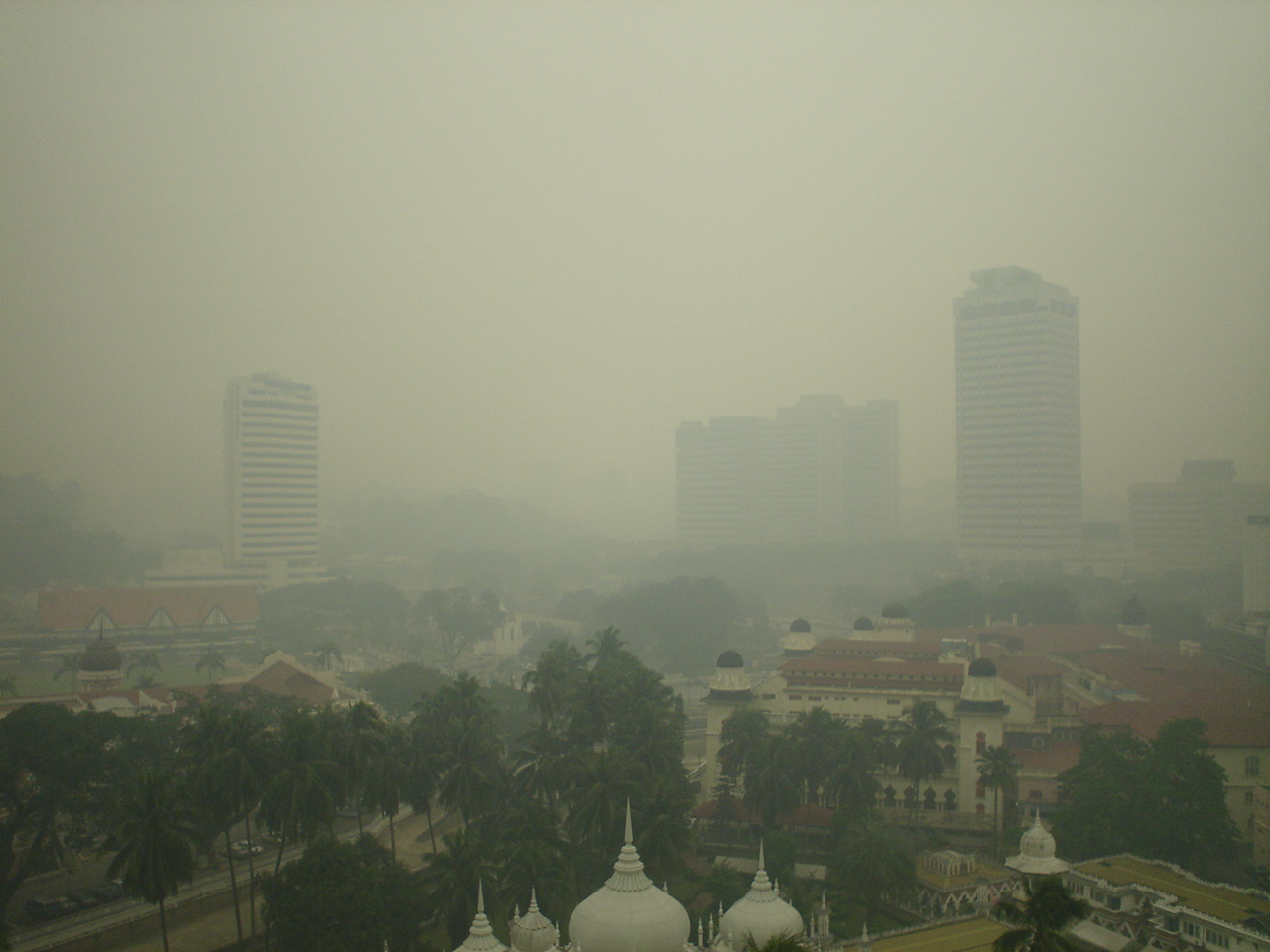
Smoke engulfing the country capital, Kuala Lumpur.

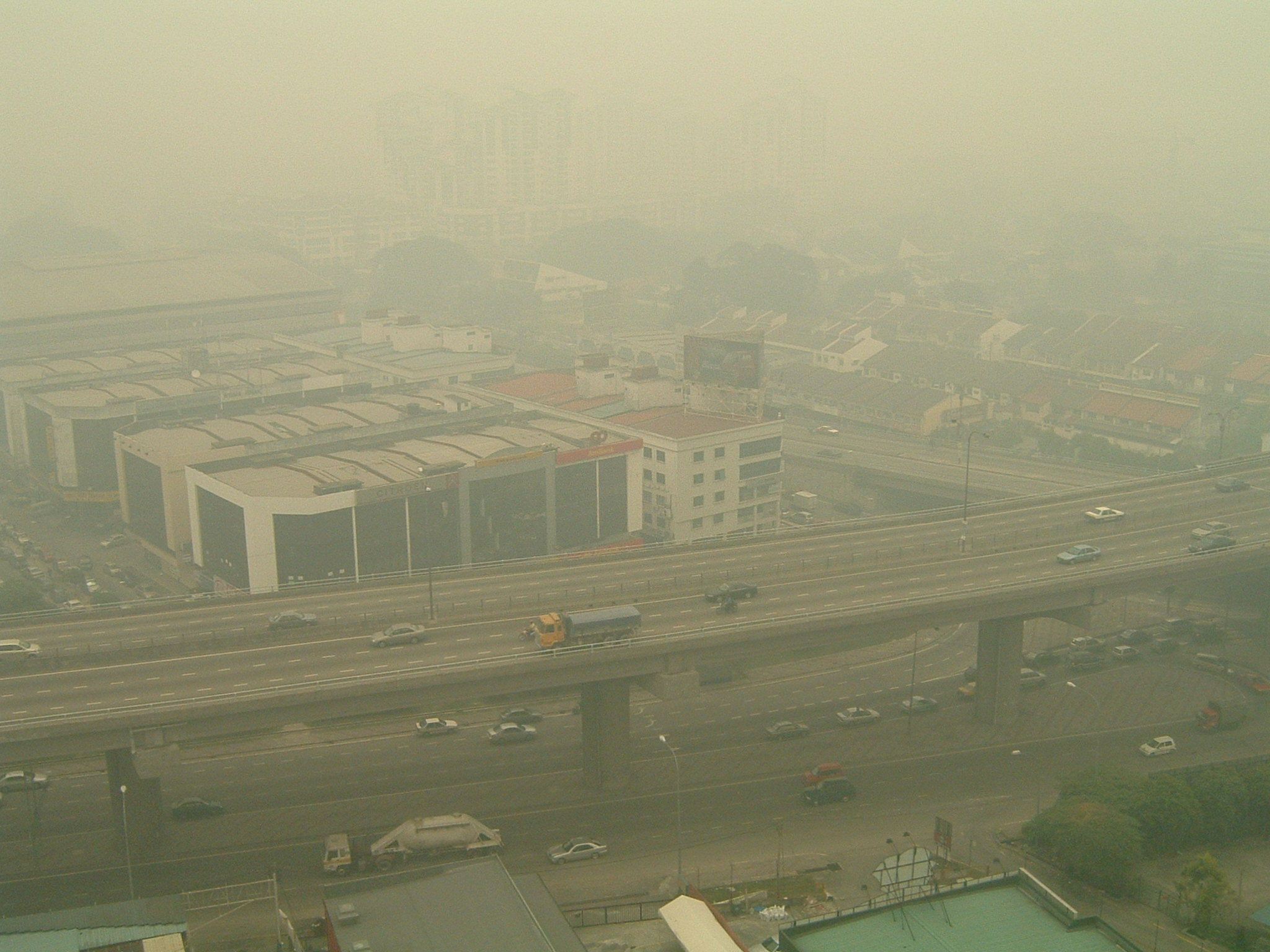
Severe haze affecting Ampang, Kuala Lumpur, Malaysia in 2005 Malaysian haze.

== Incumbent political figures ==
=== Federal level ===
- Yang di-Pertuan Agong: Tuanku Syed Sirajuddin of Perlis
- Raja Permaisuri Agong: Tengku Fauziah of Perlis
- Deputy Yang di-Pertuan Agong: Sultan Mizan Zainal Abidin of Terengganu
- Prime Minister: Tun Abdullah Ahmad Badawi
- Deputy Prime Minister: Dato' Sri Mohammad Najib Abdul Razak
- President of the Dewan Negara: Tan Sri Dato' Seri Dr. Abdul Hamid Pawanteh
- Speaker of the Dewan Rakyat: Tan Sri Dato' Seri Diraja Ramli Ngah Talib
- Chief Justice: Ahmad Fairuz Abdul Halim

=== State level ===
- Johor:
  - Sultan of Johor: Sultan Iskandar
  - Menteri Besar of Johor: Abdul Ghani Othman
- Kedah:
  - Sultan of Kedah: Sultan Abdul Halim Mu'adzam Shah
  - Menteri Besar of Kedah:
    - Syed Razak Syed Zain Barakbah (until 22 December)
    - Mahdzir Khalid (from 28 December)
- Kelantan:
  - Sultan of Kelantan: Sultan Ismail Petra
  - Menteri Besar of Kelantan: Nik Abdul Aziz Nik Mat
- Perlis:
  - Raja of Perlis: Tuanku Syed Faizuddin Putra (Regent)
  - Menteri Besar of Perlis: Shahidan Kassim
- Perak:
  - Sultan of Perak: Sultan Azlan Muhibbuddin Shah
  - Menteri Besar of Perak: Tajol Rosli Mohd Ghazali
- Pahang:
  - Sultan of Pahang: Sultan Haji Ahmad Shah Al-Musta'in Billah
  - Menteri Besar of Pahang: Adnan Yaakob
- Selangor:
  - Sultan of Selangor: Sultan Sharafuddin Idris Shah
  - Menteri Besar of Selangor: Mohamad Khir Toyo
- Terengganu:
  - Sultan of Terengganu: Sultan Mizan Zainal Abidin
  - Menteri Besar of Terengganu: Idris Jusoh
- Negeri Sembilan:
  - Yang di-Pertuan Besar of Negeri Sembilan: Tuanku Ja'afar
  - Menteri Besar of Negeri Sembilan: Mohamad Hasan
- Penang:
  - Governor of Penang: Tun Abdul Rahman Abbas
  - Chief Minister of Penang: Koh Tsu Koon
- Malacca:
  - Governor of Malacca: Tun Mohd Khalid Yaakob
  - Chief Minister of Malacca: Mohd Ali Rustam
- Sarawak:
  - Governor of Sarawak: Tun Abang Muhammad Salahuddin
  - Chief Minister of Sarawak: Abdul Taib Mahmud
- Sabah:
  - Governor of Sabah: Tun Ahmadshah Abdullah
  - Chief Minister of Sabah: Musa Aman

== Events ==
=== January ===
- 1 January – THR Raaga and Gegar was officially inaugurated by Astro and was on air over 16 states of Malaysia.

=== February ===
- 15 February – The Malaysian Maritime Enforcement Agency (MMEA) (Malaysian Coast Guard) was founded.

=== March ===
- 9 March – A student from Johor Bahru, Johor, Nur Amalina Che Bakri scored a record 17A1s in the 2004 Sijil Pelajaran Malaysia (SPM) examinations.

=== April ===
- 1 April – Siti Nurhaliza held a concert in Royal Albert Hall, London for the first time.

=== May ===
- 18 May – On Teacher's Day, a seven-year-old girl from Sekolah Rendah Agama Rantau Panjang religious school Nur Salina Saparedi was hit by a lorry while she was crossing the road at North Klang Straits Bypass in Klang, Selangor.
- 20 May – Miri was granted city status and became the second city of Sarawak, after state capital Kuching.

=== June ===
- June – A fault in the transmission line of the National Grid near Serendah, Selangor caused a blackout in northern Peninsular Malaysia.
- June – Malaysian squash player Nicol David captured the World Open title in Hong Kong and become the World No.1 in woman's squash. She was the first Asian woman to be ranked World No. 1 in the sport.

=== July ===
- July – Dr Judson Sakai anak Tagal, the Sarawak state assemblyman for Ba'kelalan, was killed in a helicopter crash in Ba'kelalan, Sarawak.
- 10 July – The NKVE-Jalan Meru flyover (now Setia Alam Interchange) collapsed onto the New Klang Valley Expressway (NKVE), killing two Bangladeshi workers and injuring seven others.
- 18 July – A group of masked vigilantes attacked the Sky Kingdom's headquarters, smashing windows and torching buildings. Two days later, 58 followers of the Sky Kingdom sect were arrested, and on 31 July three of Ariffin Mohamed known as Ayah Pin's four wives were also arrested in Kelantan. Ariffin, the leader of the sect escaped arrest and remains at large as a fugitive wanted by the Malaysian authorities. Forty-five members faced charges of failing to observe the government fatwa (i.e. for continuing to be members of a sect declared as deviant), which carried a fine up to RM 3,000 or two years in prison. One of those arrested faced an additional charge of "humiliating Islam" (for claiming not to be a Muslim).

=== August ===
- 1 August – Officials of the Besut Land Office demolished Sky Kingdom's various buildings, citing Section 129 of the National Land Code (which punishes unauthorised construction with land confiscation).
- 3 August – Mawi won the Akademi Fantasia Season 3 and became one of the top Malaysian male singers.
- 9 August – Rakan Cop, the Malaysian community police was launched.
- 10 August – 2005 Malaysian haze
  - Air quality in the Malaysian capital city of Kuala Lumpur was so poor that health officials advised citizens to stay at home with doors closed. Some schools were closed to keep children from being exposed to the haze.
  - The National Biofuel Policy was introduced.
- 11 August – 2005 Malaysian haze
  - A state of emergency was declared in announced for the world's 12th largest port, Port Klang and the district of Kuala Selangor after air pollution there reached dangerous levels (defined as a value greater than 500 on the Air Pollution Index or API).
  - The state of emergency in the two affected areas meant that schools, government officials, the port, and offices were closed. Shops carrying necessities, however, such as supermarkets and pharmacies remained open.
  - After the API levels dropped to acceptable levels, the state of emergency was lifted on 13 August.
- 13 August – 2005 Malaysian haze
  - Air quality and visibility returned to normal in Kuala Lumpur, as the haze moved northwards to the states of Perlis, Kedah and Penang, according to the Department of Environment's (JAS) API reading.
- 16 August – 2005 Malaysian haze
  - Air quality throughout Malaysia had returned to normal according to JAS statistics, as the haze was blown further northwards into Thailand.
  - Kuala Lumpur International Airport was unaffected during the hazy period but flights for non-ILS equipped planes from Subang airport were suspended until conditions cleared on 13 August.
  - Cloud seeding operations using RMAF C-130s were used throughout Malaysia, although the haze had moved north of Malaysia into Thailand and Cambodia.
  - Malaysia's Environment Minister, Adenan Satem, and Commodities Minister, Peter Chin, met with Indonesia's forestry minister and officials from its environment ministry in Medan. Malaysia had sent 125 firefighters while Australia had sent 12 bushfire experts to fight Indonesia's estimated more than a thousand forest and scrub fires (estimate reached by counting hotspots greater than 1 km on satellite imagery, example of such an image shown below).
- 22 August – 2005 Malaysian haze
  - Malaysia extended its cloud seeding operations to include Indonesia, as requested by Indonesia.
  - The haze made a brief return on 11 September.
- 27 August – Selangor was declared as the first developed state in Malaysia.

=== September ===
- 5 September – A Malaysian named Ti Teow Chuan from Sabah was among the passengers who died on Mandala Airlines Flight 91 that crashed into a heavily populated residential area in Medan, Indonesia, killing 149 including 49 people in the ground.
- 11 September – 2005 Malaysian haze
  - The haze made a brief return on 11 September.

=== October ===
- 1 October – Kota Bharu, capital of Kelantan state, was declared the first Islamic city in Malaysia.
- 20 October – Endon Mahmood, wife of the incumbent Malaysian Prime Minister Abdullah Ahmad Badawi died. Her body was laid to rest at the Muslim cemetery in Taman Selatan, Precinct 20, Putrajaya, Malaysia.

=== November ===
- 9 November – Azahari Husin, a Malaysian national and Islamic terrorist was killed in a police raid on his hideout in Indonesia.
- 12–19 November — Malaysia at the 2005 Asian Indoor Games in Bangkok, Thailand.
- 27 November – 5 December — Malaysia at the 2005 SEA Games in Manila, Philippines.
- 29 November – First Monsoon Cup international regatta held in Terengganu.

=== December ===
- 6 December – Federal governing coalition Barisan Nasional won the Pengkalan Pasir by-election in Kelantan.
- 14 December – The 11th ASEAN Summit and East Asian Summit were held in Kuala Lumpur, Malaysia.
- 14–20 December — Malaysia at the 2005 ASEAN Para Games in Manila, Philippines.

== National Day ==
=== Theme ===
Keranamu Malaysia (Because of you, Malaysia)

=== National Day parade ===
Putrajaya Square, Persiaran Perdana, Putrajaya

== Births ==
- 10 January – G. Pavithran – Footballer.
- 19 January – Haziq Aiman – Footballer.
- 11 February – Zali Rusli – Singer, Actor.
- 18 February – Eogene Ewe – Badminton Player.
- 10 March – Rykarl Iskandar – Actor, TV Host.
- 10 April – Ray-D – Singer, Actor, Dancer.
- 11 April – Muhammad Khalil – Footballer.
- 5 May – Haykal Danish – Footballer.
- 19 May – Cik B – Actress, Singer.
- 24 May – Fariz Isqandar – Actor, TV Host.
- 28 May – Bertrand Rhodict Lises – Diver.
- 2 June – Viviana Zairi – Singer, Actress, TV Host.
- 10 August – Moses Raj – Footballer.
- 23 August – Brenda Anellia Larry – Swimmer.
- 30 September – Mia Sara Nasuha – Actress.

== Deaths ==
- 17 October – Sidek Abdullah Kamar – Father of former Malaysian national badminton players.
- 20 October – Endon Mahmood, wife of the Malaysian Prime Minister Abdullah Ahmad Badawi.
- 13 November – Tan Sri Dr. Tan Chin Tuan – Former OCBC Bank (Malaysia) chairman (1966–1983).
- 29 December – Tan Sri Dr Noordin Sopiee – Executive Chairman of the Institute of Strategic and International Studies (ISIS).

== See also ==
- 2005
- 2004 in Malaysia | 2006 in Malaysia
- History of Malaysia
- List of Malaysian films of 2005
