= 2003 in Malaysia =

- Decades: 1980s; 1990s; 2000s; 2010s; 2020s
- See also: Other events of 2003; History of Malaysia • Timeline • Years

This article lists important figures and events in Malaysian public affairs during the year 2003, together with births and deaths of notable Malaysians. 2003 marked is 46th anniversary of Malaysia's Independence.

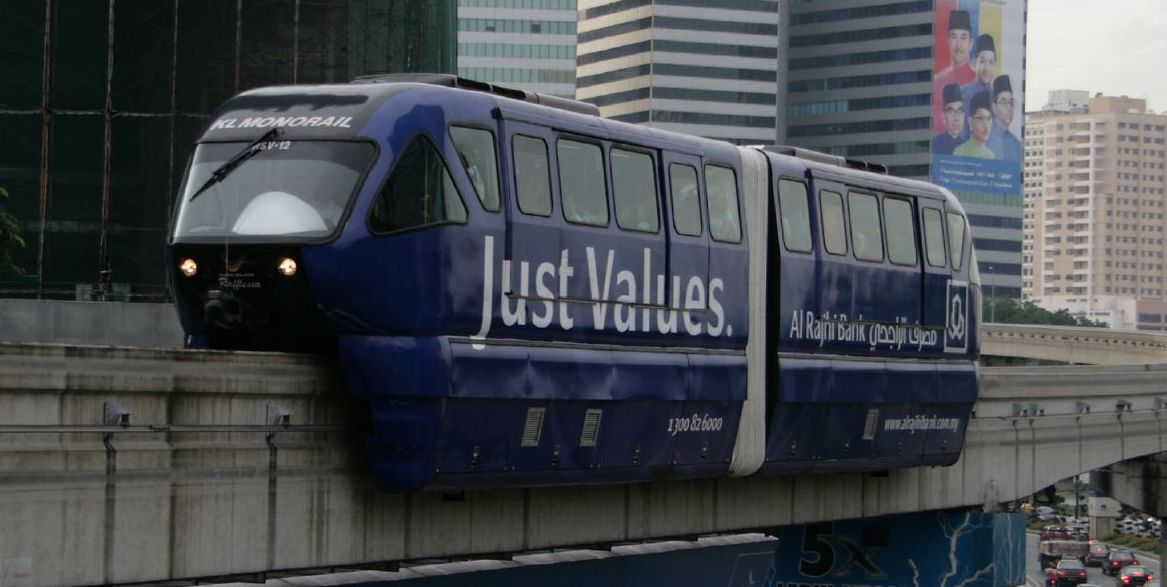
A KL Monorail in Kuala Lumpur

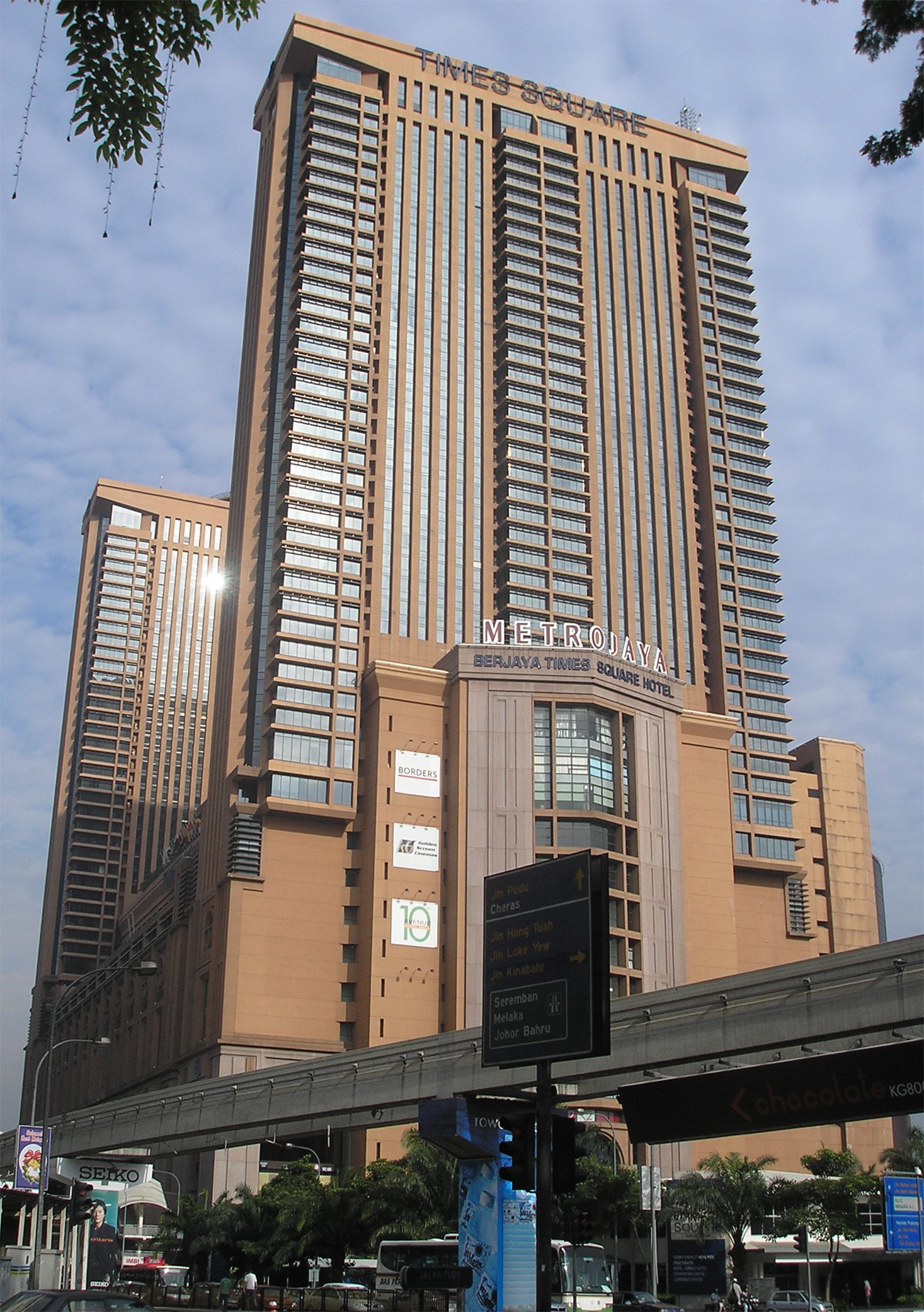
The Berjaya Times Square in Kuala Lumpur, Malaysia.

== Incumbent political figures ==
=== Federal level ===
- Yang di-Pertuan Agong: Tuanku Syed Sirajuddin of Perlis
- Raja Permaisuri Agong: Tengku Fauziah of Perlis
- Deputy Yang di-Pertuan Agong: Sultan Mizan Zainal Abidin of Terengganu
- Prime Minister:
  - Mahathir Mohamad (until 30 October)
  - Abdullah Ahmad Badawi (from 31 October)
- Deputy Prime Minister: Abdullah Ahmad Badawi (until 31 October)
- President of the Dewan Negara:
  - Michael Chen Wing Sum (until 11 April)
  - Abdul Hamid Pawanteh (from 7 July)
- Speaker of the Dewan Rakyat: Tun Dr. Mohamed Zahir Ismail
- Chief Justice:
  - Mohamed Dzaiddin Abdullah (until 14 March)
  - Ahmad Fairuz Abdul Halim (from 16 March)

=== State level ===
- Johor:
  - Sultan of Johor: Sultan Iskandar
  - Menteri Besar of Johor: Abdul Ghani Othman
- Kedah:
  - Sultan of Kedah: Sultan Abdul Halim Mu'adzam Shah
  - Menteri Besar of Kedah: Syed Razak Syed Zain Barakbah
- Kelantan:
  - Sultan of Kelantan: Sultan Ismail Petra
  - Menteri Besar of Kelantan: Nik Abdul Aziz Nik Mat
- Perlis:
  - Raja of Perlis: Tuanku Syed Faizuddin Putra (Regent)
  - Menteri Besar of Perlis: Shahidan Kassim
- Perak:
  - Sultan of Perak: Sultan Azlan Muhibbuddin Shah
  - Menteri Besar of Perak: Tajol Rosli Mohd Ghazali
- Pahang:
  - Sultan of Pahang: Sultan Haji Ahmad Shah Al-Musta'in Billah
  - Menteri Besar of Pahang: Adnan Yaakob
- Selangor:
  - Sultan of Selangor: Sultan Sharafuddin Idris Shah
  - Menteri Besar of Selangor: Mohamad Khir Toyo
- Terengganu:
  - Sultan of Terengganu: Sultan Mizan Zainal Abidin
  - Menteri Besar of Terengganu: Abdul Hadi Awang
- Negeri Sembilan:
  - Yang di-Pertuan Besar of Negeri Sembilan: Tuanku Ja'afar
  - Menteri Besar of Negeri Sembilan: Mohd Isa Abdul Samad
- Penang:
  - Governor of Penang: Tun Abdul Rahman Abbas
  - Chief Minister of Penang: Koh Tsu Koon
- Malacca:
  - Governor of Malacca: Tun Syed Ahmad Syed Mahmud Shahabuddin
  - Chief Minister of Malacca: Mohd Ali Rustam
- Sarawak:
  - Governor of Sarawak: Tun Abang Muhammad Salahuddin
  - Chief Minister of Sarawak: Abdul Taib Mahmud
- Sabah:
  - Governor of Sabah: Tun Ahmadshah Abdullah
  - Chief Minister of Sabah:
    - Chong Kah Kiat (until 27 March)
    - Musa Aman (from 27 March)

== Events ==
- 1 January
  - Visit Johor Year 2003 officially began.
  - The indirect advertising of tobacco brands was banned by the Malaysian federal government.
- 4 January – Mathematics and Science subjects in English were introduced to all primary and secondary schools for the first time.
- 14 February – The Southern Integrated Gateway projects (new CIQ complex and new bridge) in Johor Bahru were officially launched by the Malaysian prime minister, Mahathir Mohamad.
- 20–25 February – The Non-Aligned Movement (NAM) General Conference was held in Kuala Lumpur, Malaysia.
- 23 February – About 20,000 people rallied in the Bukit Jalil National Stadium to show support for "Malaysians for Peace".
- 9 March – Sultan Sharafuddin Idris Shah of Selangor was crowned as the 9th Sultan of Selangor.
- 5 April – A 64-year-old man from Jerantut, Pahang died of Severe Acute Respiatory Syndrome (SARS) virus.
- May – The Royal Malaysian Air Force (RMAF) signed a deal to purchase 18 Russian Sukhoi Su-30MKM jet fighters worth almost $1 billion. The Su-30MKMs would be delivered in batches starting in early 2007. As part of the deal, the Russians would send a Malaysian astronaut (angkasawan) to the International Space Station (ISS).
- 23 May – Ling Liong Sik resigns as MCA president.
- 25 May – A 19-year-old salesgirl died when a car driven by 21-year-old college student crashed into her and several friends seated at a table set up at a roadside in front of a 24-hour restaurant in Section 14, Petaling Jaya, Selangor.
- 8 June – 2003 International Penang Bridge Run.
- 14 June – It analyst, Canny Ong was raped and murdered. Her body was found at the New Pantai Expressway construction site in Jalan Klang Lama near Kampung Dato' Harun, Petaling Jaya, Selangor.
- 23 June – The base of a tower once part of the Porto de Santiago fort built by the Portuguese 500 years earlier was discovered near the Heroes Esplanade (Padang Pahlawan), Malacca.
- 24 July
  - Malaysia and Singapore jointly submitted to the International Court of Justice (ICJ) a dispute concerning sovereignty over Pulau Batu Puteh (Pedra Branca), Middle Rocks and South Ledge.
  - The Federal Special Forces of Malaysia (FSFM) was declared an illegal organisation by the federal government because its activities posed a threat to national security. Nor Azami Ahmad Ghazali the leader of the FSFM and 24 of its members were arrested.
- August – Naza Ria, Malaysia's first MPV vehicle was launched.
- 3 August – Abdul Malik Mydin became the first Malaysian and Southeast Asian to cross the English Channel by swimming from Dover, England to Calais, France.
- 26 August – Sultanah Bahiyah of Kedah, a consort of Sultan Abdul Halim Mu'adzam Shah of Kedah died of cancer. She was buried at the Kedah Royal Mausoleum in Langgar.
- 31 August
  - The quick-march version of Negaraku national anthem of Malaysia reverted to the original slow-march version.
  - Malaysia's first monorail transit system, KL Monorail began operations.
- September – The Royal Malaysian Navy (RMN) signed a deal to purchase two of the French Scorpène-class submarines worth almost $1 billion.
- 18 September – Prime Minister Mahathir Mohamad paid a glowing tribute to former MCA president Ling Liong Sik for his successful service as transport minister and Cabinet minister for 27 years.
- 23 September – Media Prima Berhad, Malaysia's largest integrated media group of companies was launched.
- 3 October – Berjaya Times Square, the highest shopping complex in Kuala Lumpur, Malaysia was officially opened.
- 15 October – The opening of Malacca Tropical Fruit Farm in Malacca.
- 16–17 October – The Organisation of Islamic Cooperation (OIC) General Conference was held in Putrajaya.
- 22 October – Alor Setar was granted city status.
- 30 October – Mahathir Mohamad as resigned prime minister.
- 31 October – Abdullah Ahmad Badawi became the fifth prime minister, replacing Mahathir Mohamad.
- 25 November – The construction of the SMART Tunnel projects began.
- 26 November – A rockfall on the New Klang Valley Expressway (NKVE) near the Bukit Lanjan interchange caused the expressway to close for more than six months.
- December – The Malaysian National Service (Program Latihan Khidmat Negara (PLKN)) was introduced as the conscription training program.
- 1 December – 14 passengers were killed in an early morning collision involving two buses – a school bus which was converted for commercial use and an express bus – at the 63rd kilometre of the Kuala Lipis–Merapoh trunk road near Merapoh, Pahang. 23 others were injured.
- 5–13 December – Malaysia at the 2003 SEA Games in Vietnam.
- 21–27 December – Malaysia at the 2003 ASEAN Para Games in Vietnam.

== National Day ==
=== Theme ===
Keranamu Malaysia (Because of you, Malaysia)

=== National Day parade ===
Putrajaya Square, Persiaran Perdana, Putrajaya

== Births ==
- 6 January – Haqimi Azim – Footballer.
- 11 January – Najmuddin Akmal – Footballer.
- 30 March – Syahmi Adib Haikal – Footballer.
- 30 November – Ubaidullah Shamsul – Footballer.

== Deaths ==
- 5 July – Tun Sulaiman Ninam Shah – UMNO annual meeting permanent chairman.
- 9 August – Ali Bakar – Footballer.
- 26 August – Sultanah Bahiyah of Kedah, 5th Raja Permaisuri Agong.
- 19 October – Dato' Seri Harun Idris – 9th Menteri Besar of Selangor.

== See also ==
- 2003
- 2002 in Malaysia | 2004 in Malaysia
- History of Malaysia
- List of Malaysian films of 2003
