= Clash of Times =

2007 tennis exhibition match

- (Switzerland) Roger Federer vs. (United States) Pete Sampras
Set	1	2
(Switzerland) Roger Federer	7	7
(United States) Pete Sampras	6	6
- Date: Merdeka Tennis Challenge
- Location: Kuala Lumpur, Malaysia

The Clash of Times was a tennis exhibition match between Roger Federer and Pete Sampras which took place on 22 November 2007 at Stadium Malawati, Shah Alam, in Kuala Lumpur. Roger won the match by 7/6(6) 7/6(5).

== The Clash of Times (Roger Federer vs Pete Sampras) ==
The Clash of Times was a tennis exhibition match between Roger Federer and Pete Sampras which took place on 22 November 2007 at Stadium Malawati, Shah Alam, in Kuala Lumpur as part of Malaysia's 50th anniversary of independence (it was a part of Inaugural Merdeka Tennis Challenge).

Roger won a close match 7/6(6) 7/6(5).

The “one of a kind” Malaysia Independence Tennis Festival featured three major events: The first was a challenge match between Rafael Nadal against French top player and Wimbledon semi-finalist Richard Gasquet. The “center piece” being the Clash of Times challenge match between Roger Federer and Pete Sampras, as well as an ATP Challenger Series tournament – the Malaysia Open.

The Schedule was as follows:

Clash of Titans – Rafael Nadal vs Richard Gasquet (best of 3 sets) Date: Tuesday, November 20, 2007, Venue: Malawati Stadium, Shah Alam

Time: 8pm to 10pm

Nadal vs. Gasquet
2	(Spain) Rafael Nadal	3	6	6
8	(France) Richard Gasquet	6	2	3

Clash of Times – Pete Sampras vs Roger Federer (best of 3 sets)

Date: Thursday, November 22, 2007, Venue: Malawati Stadium, Shah Alam Time: 8pm to 10pm

Event: Malaysia Open – ATP Challenger Series Tournament Date: November 17–25, 2007 Format: Men's Singles and Doubles Venue: National Tennis Centre, Jalan Duta, Kuala Lumpur Time: 10am to 10pm
