= National Integrity Plan =

The National Integrity Plan (Malay: Pelan Integriti Nasional; PIN) was a strategy developed and launched by the government of Malaysia on 23 April 2004, under then-Prime Minister of Malaysia Abdullah Ahmad Badawi, with the primary goal of fostering a culture of ethics and integrity across all segments of Malaysian society. It was designed to align with the fourth challenge of Wawasan 2020, which sought to build a society with strong moral and ethical values, where citizens possessed robust religious and spiritual principles underpinned by noble character. The plan was coordinated, monitored, and evaluated by the Malaysian Institute of Integrity.

A culture of ethics and integrity is vital in any organization, as it ensures that programs and objectives are implemented effectively and ethically. The PIN aimed to enable the government to systematically design programs to cultivate ethics and integrity within society. Previous efforts to promote integrity had been inconsistent and insufficiently comprehensive, resulting in significant failures, particularly in achieving synergy across all sectors. These shortcomings stemmed from obstacles such as individual attitudes, organizational leadership, delivery systems, bureaucratic inefficiencies, and the discipline and cultural practices of society in executing programs. The scope and concepts introduced by the PIN were more comprehensive and holistic, providing guidance to all societal components to promote integrity. The plan was replaced by the National Anti-Corruption Plan (NACP) in 2019.
