= Kontik Kamariah Ahmad =

Malaysian businesswoman (1911–2006)

Tan Sri Datin Sri Cempaka Kontik Kamariah binti Ahmad (5 August 1911 – 17 August 2006) scored many “firsts” for women in the co-operative movement, education and politics in Malaysia.

== Life ==
Born in Kampung Seputih, Kuala Lumpur on Aug 5, 1911, Kamariah was educated at a Malay school in her village and then Methodist Girls School Kuala Lumpur (MGSKL) where she emerged as the first Malay girl in Malaysia to pass the Senior Cambridge examination in 1928. Her father was businessman-politician Ahmad Panglima Garang Ishak.

She had her teacher training at Victoria Institution (VI) before she was made supervisor of Malay schools in Selangor in 1932-45 and 1948-56 – the first woman to hold the post.

She also excelled in the cooperative movement and was the chairman of the Co-op Union of Malaya (now Malaysia) – the only woman to hold the post.

In 1948, when teachers could not get loans, she helped set up the Selangor Co-op and Thrift and Loans Society. She later helped set up the Selangor Government Officers Housing Co-operative which built a housing project in 1954 and named it Taman Kamariah in her honour.

For her contributions to the cooperative movement, she was awarded a British Empire Medal.

In politics, she was active in UMNO's Kaum Ibu wing, the forerunner of Wanita Umno, and served as Kampung Baru branch secretary and Gombak Setia Umno committee member. She was also active in Pertiwi, an Islamic women's activist group.

The Sultan of Selangor, Sultan Salahuddin Abdul Aziz Shah appointed her as Orang Kaya Maha Bijaya (a traditional title for a native overlord) for the Gombak district in 1979 – the first woman so honoured.

In 1996, the Yang di-Pertuan Agong conferred on her the Panglima Setia Mahkota, which carries the title Tan Sri.

== Death ==
Kamariah died on 17 August 2006 at the age of 95 and was buried at the Jalan Ampang Muslim Cemetery, Kuala Lumpur. She is survived by a son and a daughter.

== Honour ==
=== Honour of Malaysia ===
- Malaysia
  - Commander of the Order of Loyalty to the Crown of Malaysia (P.S.M.) (1996)
