= Rosiah Chik =

Malaysian singer

Rosiah Chik or Rosiah Abdul Manaf (1931–2006) was Malay traditional singer particularly of asli and ghazal songs, made famous in the 1960s–1970s in Malaysia. She was also known as Mak We among the people of the industry and her fans.

== Personal life ==
She was born in Kuala Sedili, Kota Tinggi, Johore. She had four sons and two daughters. She suffered bacterial infections in her lungs during her final days. Rosiak Chik, 75 years old, died on Friday, January 20, 2006 in Hospital Kuala Lumpur due to heart attack.

== Career ==
At 14 years of age, she made her debut performance in local weddings usually under the tents. However, she started her career seriously son after the divorce which eventually made her to join the Cathay Keris in Singapore as a backup singer. During her career, she managed to produce only two solo albums due to her commitments of collaboration albums with other singers. She once wrote the lyrics for her very own song.

== Discography ==
- Ala Canggung
- Dondang Sayang
- Keluhan Lela Manja
- Dang Anum
- Lela Majnun
- Embun Di Rumput
- Zapin Senandung Dua

== Filmography ==
- Air Mata
- Merana
- Mangsa
- Sumpah Orang Minyak
- Sumpahan Mahsuri

== Awards ==
- Anugerah Juara Lagu 1995 (Final)
- Rosiah Chik won the Anugerah Sri Wirama of Anugerah Industri Muzik AIM 2001.
