= Malaysiaku Gemilang =

Malaysiaku Gemilang (Malay: My Glorious Malaysia) is a Malaysian patriotic song and the anthem of the 50th Merdeka Day celebrations of 2007.

== Lyrics ==
Original Malay Lyrics	English translation
Marilah kita semua, Atas nama negara bangsa, Dengan tekad mulia, Maju berwawasan, Mencipta keagungan. Berpadulah kita semua, Didalam satu suara, Dengan degupan merdeka, Menjulang budaya bangsa, Untuk Malaysia tercinta. Malaysiaku gemilang, Merdekanya terbilang, Berdaulat dan makmur, Berjaya kami syukur. Malaysia kebebasan kedamaian, Malaysia kebahagiaan kebanggaan, Malaysia cemerlang terbilang, Malaysiaku gagah gemilang.	Let us all come together, In the name of our nation, With faithful dignity, A developed vision, Creating majesty. Uniting us all, Into one voice, With the sound of independence, Boosting the nation’s culture For the Malaysia that we love My Glorious Malaysia, Its famous independence, Sovereignty and prosperity, We have gratefully succeeded. Malaysia, freedom and peace, Malaysia, bliss and pride, Malaysia, excellent and famous, My Malaysia, brave and glorious.
