= Malaysian Institute of Integrity =

- Institut Integriti Malaysia

Agency overview
- Formed: 4 March 2004; 22 years ago
- Headquarters: Persiaran Tuanku Syed Sirajuddin, Bukit Tunku, 50480 Kuala Lumpur, Federal Territory of Kuala Lumpur
- Agency executives: Tan Sri Shamsul Azri bin Abu Bakar, Chairman; Datuk Seri Noridah binti Abdul Rahim, Chief Executive Officer
- Parent agency: Prime Minister's Department (Malaysia)
- Website: https://www.iim.gov.my/

The Malaysian Institute of Integrity (Malay: Institut Integriti Malaysia; IIM) is a Malaysian government agency under the Prime Minister’s Department (JPM). Established under the Companies Act on 4 March 2004 as a company limited by guarantee, it initially coordinated and monitored the implementation of the National Integrity Plan (PIN), later transitioning to support the National Anti-Corruption Plan (NACP) from January 2019 and the National Anti-Corruption Strategy (NACS) from May 2024.

The IIM is responsible for developing the competence and capacity of public and private sectors in matters of "governance, integrity, and anti-corruption" through consultancy services, tools, and training programs.

== History ==
On 1 November 2003, Malaysia’s fifth Prime Minister, Abdullah Ahmad Badawi, announced the establishment of a public ethics institute and the implementation of the National Integrity Plan to promote effective governance, accountability, and efficiency in both the public and private sectors. This announcement was made during a press conference following his first Cabinet meeting in Putrajaya after assuming office as Prime Minister. The Malaysian Integrity Institute (IIM) was established under the Companies Act on 4 March 2004 as a company limited by guarantee under the Prime Minister’s Department. Following this, Abdullah officially launched the institute and the National Integrity Plan (PIN) on 23 April 2004.

The IIM was established as the coordinating and monitoring agency for the PIN, with the objective of building a resilient Malaysia that upholds integrity and embraces universal noble values. The government also declared 5 November 2005 as National Integrity Day to cultivate integrity, promote universal noble values, and strengthen governance within society.

== Governance ==
The Board of Directors is responsible for administering and setting policies for the Malaysian Integrity Institute (IIM). The board consists of seven members and is chaired by Shamsul Azri Abu Bakar. The IIM’s management team is led by Noridah Abdul Rahim, who serves as its Chief Executive Officer.

== Initiatives ==
=== National Integrity Plan (2004–2019) ===
The National Integrity Plan (PIN) was a master plan introduced to provide direction and guidance to all components of society and the nation. The PIN aimed to foster, nurture, and strengthen a societal and national system that promoted morality and ethics, thereby building a nation of integrity.

=== National Anti-Corruption Plan (2019–2024) ===
The concept for the National Anti-Corruption Plan (NACP) originated during the 14th General Election, where Pakatan Harapan emphasized efforts to ensure Malaysia was recognized for integrity rather than corruption. Following the election, the Special Cabinet Committee on Anti-Corruption (JKKMAR), chaired by Prime Minister Mahathir Mohamad, Malaysia’s seventh Prime Minister, decided on 8 June 2018 that a comprehensive anti-corruption plan was urgently needed to address corruption issues in the country. This led to the creation of the NACP, launched in January 2019, the Malaysian government’s primary document outlining comprehensive and integrated measures to combat corruption. The NACP was the first plan of its kind to integrate governance, integrity, and anti-corruption within a unified framework.

The NACP’s vision was to create a corruption-free nation through three specific goals: accountability and credibility in the judiciary, prosecution, and law enforcement agencies; efficient and responsive public service delivery; and integrity in business. The NACP outlined a long-term anti-corruption vision with 115 initiatives for implementation. Through its six strategies, the NACP ensured enhanced anti-corruption efforts among political actors, corporate entities, law enforcement agencies, and stakeholders. Stakeholders were expected to develop Organizational Anti-Corruption Plans (OACP) to address integrity, governance, and anti-corruption issues within their organizations.

=== National Anti-Corruption Strategy (2024–2028) ===
The National Anti-Corruption Strategy (NACS), launched on 7 May 2024 by Prime Minister Anwar Ibrahim, aims to eliminate corruption and enhance governance, integrity, and transparency in Malaysia. Succeeding the National Anti-Corruption Plan (NACP), it supports the Malaysia Madani agenda and targets a top 25 ranking in Transparency International’s Corruption Perception Index within 10 years.

The NACS features five strategies—Education, Public Accountability, People’s Voice, Enforcement, and Incentives—with 60 sub-strategies. Key initiatives include ethical education, laws like the Public Procurement Act, whistleblower protections, and tax incentives. The Malaysian Anti-Corruption Commission (MACC) monitors progress via the r-NACS system, with the National Audit Department (JAN) aiding through the Auditor General’s Dashboard and internal audit enhancements. It addresses issues like nepotism and hidden influences, promoting public participation to reduce corruption.
