= Rakan Cop =

Rakan Cop (Malay: Friends of Cops) is the Malaysian community police corps which was launched by Royal Malaysian Police in Kuala Lumpur on 9 August 2005 to help combat crime in the city and any situations around Malaysia.
