= Lauren Hoh Ruyi =

Malaysian footballer (born 2006)

Personal information
- Full name: Lauren Hoh Ruyi
- Date of birth: 27 January 2006 (age 20)
- Place of birth: Kuala Lumpur, Malaysia
- Height: 1.63 m (5 ft 4 in)
- Positions: Right-back; winger

Team information
- Current team: Trinity Bantams
- Number: 18

Youth career
- 2014–2016: Goal Elite Football Academy
- 2016–2019: FC Kuala Lumpur
- 2019–2024: BISP Cruzeiro Academy

College career
Years	Team	Apps	(Gls)
2024–	Trinity Bantams		

Senior career*
Years	Team	Apps	(Gls)
2024	Kelana United		(2)
2025	Young Tigress		
2026	Chicago KICS FC		

International career^{‡}
2019–2022	Malaysia U15/U16/U18		
2023–2025	Malaysia U20		
2023–	Malaysia		(0)
- * Club domestic league appearances and goals as of 28 October 2025 ‡ National team caps and goals as of 25 October 2025

Lauren Hoh Ruyi (born 27 January 2006) is a Malaysian footballer who plays as a right-back or winger for the Trinity Bantams and represents the Malaysia women's national football team. She can also play at centre-back, in defensive midfield and as a forward. Lauren captained Malaysia at the 2025 ASEAN U-19 Women's Championship, played for Kelana United in the Malaysia National Women's League, joined Women's Premier Soccer League club Chicago KICS FC in 2026, and was part of the Selangor team that won the women's football gold medal at the 2026 Malaysia Games.

== Early life and youth career ==
Lauren was born in Kuala Lumpur and began playing organised football at the age of eight. With relatively few girls' teams available to her, she initially played in a boys' team at Goal Elite Football Academy.

From 2016 to 2019, Lauren played for FC Kuala Lumpur (FCKL), continuing to compete in boys' teams. In 2017, she was named FCKL's under-10 Player of the Year and its overall Club Player of the Year across the boys' age groups. She was subsequently nominated for the club's under-12 Player of the Year award in 2018.

== BISP Cruzeiro Academy ==
In 2019, at the age of 13, Lauren received a football scholarship to attend the British International School, Phuket (BISP) in Thailand and joined the school's BISP Cruzeiro Football Academy. The move required her to live away from her family in Malaysia as a full-time boarding student while combining her education with the academy's high-performance football programme.

At BISP, Lauren trained within a Brazilian-influenced system that emphasised possession, technique and decision-making. Although primarily an outside back, she also developed experience in central defence, defensive midfield and more advanced positions. She progressed through the academy to the senior girls' team and was appointed its captain for her final season.

During her time with BISP, Lauren competed in school and academy tournaments in Thailand and elsewhere in Asia. Her teams won the under-18 girls' divisions at the 2020 Bangkok International Schools tournament, the 2022 Harrow International School Cup and the 2022 International School Bangkok tournament. She also competed in boys' football during her earlier period with the academy, including tournament appearances in Phuket and Singapore. Lauren also captained a BISP girls' team during an international competition trip to Portugal. BISP's football programme has regularly sent teams to international competitions, including the IberCup in Portugal.

Lauren remained at BISP until graduating in 2024. Her period in Phuket coincided with her progression through Malaysia's youth national teams and culminated in her senior international debut at the 2023 SEA Games.

== Education ==
Alongside the academy's high-performance training schedule and her Malaysia national-team commitments, Lauren followed BISP's academic programme as a boarding student. She was recognised as a high-achieving student and maintained a strong academic record while balancing schoolwork, daily football training and international competition.

After graduating from BISP in 2024, Lauren enrolled at Trinity College, a liberal arts college in Hartford, Connecticut, where she continued as a student-athlete while playing NCAA Division III soccer.

== Club and college career ==
=== Kelana United and Young Tigress ===
Lauren returned to Malaysia in 2024 and joined Kelana United for the Malaysia National Women's League. In Kelana United's opening match, she scored a late winning goal in a 1–0 victory over Selangor. She was subsequently associated with the Young Tigress development side in 2025.

=== Trinity College ===
Lauren enrolled at Trinity College in 2024 and joined its NCAA Division III women's soccer team, the Trinity Bantams.

=== Chicago KICS ===
In May 2026, Chicago KICS FC announced Lauren as a member of its squad for the 2026 Women's Premier Soccer League season.

=== Selangor and SUKMA ===
Lauren represented Selangor in the women's football competition at the 2026 Malaysia Games (SUKMA). Selangor retained the gold medal after defeating Sabah 2–0 in the final at Selayang Stadium on 19 August 2026.

== International career ==
=== Youth teams ===
Lauren received her first Malaysia youth-team call-up at 13 and played at the 2019 AFF U-15 Girls' Championship. Malaysia played five group matches, recording victories over Singapore and Cambodia. Later that year, she represented Malaysia at a UEFA-organised under-15 development tournament, playing against Finland, Thailand and Hong Kong. Malaysia defeated Thailand 1–0.

In 2022, Lauren represented Malaysia at the AFF U-18 Women's Championship in Indonesia. She later progressed to the national under-20 side and participated in AFC youth competition.

Lauren captained Malaysia at the 2025 ASEAN U-19 Women's Championship in Vietnam. Playing in midfield, she started as captain in Malaysia's 4–0 opening victory over Cambodia.

In August 2025, Lauren was selected for Malaysia's squad for the 2026 AFC U-20 Women's Asian Cup qualification tournament in Kuala Lumpur. Malaysia recorded a 2–0 victory over Guam during the qualifying campaign.

=== Senior team ===
Lauren was named in Malaysia's squad for the women's football tournament at the 2023 SEA Games in Cambodia. She made her senior international debut against Myanmar in May 2023 and also featured during Malaysia's group-stage campaign against Vietnam and the hosts Cambodia.

In November 2024, Lauren was selected for Malaysia's final squad for the AFF Women's Cup in Laos.

In October 2025, Lauren was recalled to the senior squad for two Tier 1 international friendlies against Hong Kong on 22 and 25 October. She appeared in the second match at the Kai Tak Youth Sports Ground on 25 October.

Since moving to the United States, Lauren has balanced her international career with the academic calendar and collegiate soccer commitments at Trinity College. The timing of Malaysian training camps and international windows, together with the long-distance travel involved, has at times affected her availability for national-team call-ups.

== International tournament record ==
Year	Team	Competition	Malaysia matches	Result/record
2019	Malaysia U15	AFF U-15 Girls' Championship	5	Group stage
2019	Malaysia U15	UEFA U-15 development tournament	3	Three matches
2022	Malaysia U18	AFF U-18 Women's Championship	3	Group stage
2023	Malaysia senior	Southeast Asian Games	3	Group stage
2025	Malaysia U19	ASEAN U-19 Women's Championship	3	Captain; group stage
2025	Malaysia U20	AFC U-20 Women's Asian Cup qualification	3	Qualifying campaign
2025	Malaysia senior	Friendlies against Hong Kong	2	Selected for both; appearance confirmed in second match

The tournament table records Malaysia's matches in each event and should not be read as an exact cap total unless Lauren's participation in every match is confirmed by an official line-up. Publicly accessible databases do not presently provide a complete match-by-match record for all Malaysian youth internationals.

== Honours ==
Selangor

- Sukma Games women's football: gold medal, 2026

== Media appearances and advocacy ==
In 2018, Lauren appeared as a girl footballer in a Superkids segment associated with Mickey Mouse Clubhouse and broadcast on Playhouse Disney.

In June 2025, Lauren wrote a first-person article, "The Game That Raised Me", for Malaysian women's football platform The Pitch Invaders. The article reflected on her childhood, development through boys' football in Malaysia, move to BISP in Thailand, national-team career and transition to college soccer in the United States.

Lauren appeared twice on Malaysian radio station BFM 89.9 in August 2025. She was interviewed on the 11 August season premiere of Just For Kicks, and was subsequently the subject of the 42-minute feature interview "Lauren Ruyi – The Best Is Yet To Come" on 15 August.

In 2025, Lauren participated in a panel organised by the Embassy of Belgium in Malaysia, the All Women's Action Society and the United Nations Population Fund on sexual harassment in sport. She spoke about the experiences of young women athletes and barriers to reporting misconduct.
