= Malaysian Independence Day parade =

Annual parade, held 31 August

The Independence Day Parade (Malay: Perarakan Hari Merdeka) is held every 31 August in commemoration of Malaya's independence. Since independence, the event has been usually held at the Independence Square in Kuala Lumpur, the original site of the first independence parade held on 1 September 1957.

There were also times where the celebrations were held on a smaller scale. In 2009, the national day parade was held at a small scale in the Parliament of Malaysia. The audience was reduced to 4,000 because of the 2009 flu pandemic at that time. The 2010 parade was also the first time that an Independence Day Parade will be held indoors instead of outdoors due to respect the Ramadan month which was welcomed at that time, with the 2011 celebrations originally planned to be held in a larger arena due to the success of that year's edition but because second day of Eid al-Fitr was welcomed at that time in Malaysia, its was later planned to be at the Independence Square in Kuala Lumpur to be held on 16 September, with Malaysia Day, for the very first time.

The human graphic display is one of the many regular features of the parade, together with the mass presentation by members of Soka Gakkai Malaysia and the Selangor Department of Education, dressed in the colours of the national flag, forming different displays in the ground, as well as of an multi-racial percussion (and sometimes instrumental) component.

== Summary of the parade ==
At the Independence Square in front of the Sultan Abdul Samad Building or since 1985 in various Malaysian state capitals and in Putrajaya since 2003, a stage is set for the guests and government and military personnel and officials in attendance. The Royal Malay Regiment or another military unit of the three services of the Malaysian Armed Forces (sometimes with the Mounted Ceremonial Squadron, Royal Armoured Corps) prepares to fulfill its duties as the Guard of Honour Company, with a military band joining them.

At the venue, a human graphic display is also being readied, by then now formed on a terrace in front of the Royal Box, prepares its field presentation by forming a couple of formations using props such as Pom-Poms, colored flags, and the Flag of Malaysia. A compilation of traditional and viral malaysian music is then played, in which the human graphic perfomers will dance to as their Pre-Show activity.

When the Prime Minister of Malaysia and the Deputy Prime Minister(s) arrive, together with the Ministers of Defense and Home Affairs, and the chiefs of the armed forces, the Parade will present its salute and present arms. No colours are to be dipped at that point of the parade by the guard of honor. No salutes are rendered to members of Parliament and senators.

=== Arrival of the Sovereigns ===
At 8:00 in the morning, HM the King of Malaysia and HM the Queen arrive at the venue, accompanied by a Royal Procession by members of the Royal Malaysian Police and the Mounted Ceremonial Squadron, RAC, as the MCS's trumpeters sound the arrival fanfare. The Royal Standard is then unfurled using the 'quick release knot' technique from the top of a flagpole, signifying the presence of the King at the event. The Guard of Honor Company, now at attention, renders a Royal Salute to the Sovereigns (in light of the King's responsibilities as Supreme Commander in Chief of the Armed Forces), the unit Colours of the GOH battalion (Sovereign's and Regimental) are dipped and the National Anthem, Negaraku, is played by the military band, as a flypast of the National Flag is also done at the same time by personnel of the aviation elements of the Armed Forces.

After this, the GOH does shoulder and then order arms. The GOH commander then salutes his sword and then reports to the King that the GOH is ready for inspection.

=== Royal Inspection ===
By the time the inspection starts the slow Menjunjung Duli march is played. Escorted by the GOH commander, the Chief of the Defence Forces and his two aides-de-camp, the King inspects the GOH Company and salutes its Sovereign's and Regimental Colours.

When it ends, the GOH commander then reports the end of the inspection and asks for the GOH to march past, and later orders the company for the Royal Salute. The National Anthem is then played again and the Colours are again dipped in the presence of the Sovereigns. After this, the GOH Company executes shoulder arms and turn right and then perform a march past the royal dais together with the trumpeters and lancers.

=== Flag Raising and the Rukun Negara recitation ===
At the parade venue, a colour guard by servicemen from the Royal Malaysian Navy escorting the Flag of Malaysia approach the flagpole together with selected Malaysians, reenacting the flag raising which had been done in Stadium Merdeka in 1957. The flag is then raised to Negaraku and a 14-gun salute is done by gunners of the Royal Artillery Regiment (usually the unit firing the guns is the 43rd Battalion, Royal Artillery Regiment). After the flag raising, the Rukun Negara (National Principles) is first read by the emcee and in recent years, the Maka kami part of the pledge onward is then recited by the whole parade, dignitaries and the audience together with the left hand at the shoulder level. After this, seven shouts of Merdeka! (Independence!) with the right hand raised are said, and since 2007 and from 2009 onward, even the theme for that year is being shouted as well. The sevenfold shout too is also a reenactment of the same moment that occurred in Stadium Merdeka in 1957.

=== Cultural and patriotic performances ===
After the flag raising, patriotic songs are sung with the accompaniment of ethnic percussion. Young dancers dressed as the various races and ethnic groups of the country dance about, with that year's theme song as one of the numbers. The SGM members and education students perform delicate and well prepared formations on the parade grounds, while the human graphic display shows intricate writings on the stand made by pompoms and coloured flags among others.

=== Parade segment ===
==== Flypast ====
Planes of the Royal Malaysian Air Force, the Malaysian Army Air Force and the Royal Malaysian Navy fly overhead in a second salute to the nation, led by military helicopters flying the Flag of Malaysia, the Flags of the Malaysian Armed Forces and its three services and the flags of the 13 Malaysian states and 3 Malaysian federal territories. Military aircraft (planes, jets and helicopters) then follow behind the colours party followed by aircraft from the Royal Malaysian Police, Maritime Enforcement Agency and Fire and Rescue Department.

==== Civil-military march past ====
After the flypast, the much-awaited civil/military march starts with the march past of the Malaysian national and state flags. Military and police contingents from the Malaysian Armed Forces and the Royal Malaysian Police, youth uniformed groups, Army, Air Force and Navy special operations commandos, Armed Forces and Police counter-terrorist units, bomb squads, pilots of the Royal Malaysian Air Force and the Royal Malaysian Navy's Naval Air Group, military reservists, personnel of the RELA Corps, Maritime Enforcement Agency, Civil Defence Force, Fire and Rescue Department, Prisons Department, Immigration Department and Customs, civilian organisations, youth uniformed organizations, veterans organizations and local government delegations (including the Kuala Lumpur City Hall), federal ministries and business entities march past the parade stage in front of the Sovereigns and guests on the stage. The march past also includes a number of historical companies. Military bands and marching bands also march past, playing music to the delight of everyone in attendance, and when they pass by the Sovereigns their drum majors, conductors and colour guards salute them. One of the top contingents marching past is the contingent representing Malaysian animation (formed by the Animation Society and animation production firm Les' Copaque Production), in recent years this part of the march past has also seen interactive public participation as well.

==== Floats ====
In every parade, floats representing the various companies and corporations celebrating the occasion drive past the street, which is described as amazing, due to their intricate designs and various features.

==== Mobile and mounted columns ====
Also part of the parade is the mobile column showing the different vehicles of the Malaysian Armed Forces, the Royal Malaysian Police, the Civil Defence Forces, Fire and Rescue Agency, Prisons Agency and Kuala Lumpur City Hall plus representatives of the federal ministries and the private sector. The mobile column also includes veterans from the uniformed and civil services of the federation and the states and territories. Rounding up the parade is the mounted column composed of members of the MCS and mounted squadrons from the RMP and the KLCH.

A civil mobile column is also featured, made up of nationally produced vehicles from firms like Proton and others, and vintage cars from a number of manufacturers honoring the transport manufacture workers of the country.

== List of venues for national-level parade ==
Year	Venue	Notes	Ref
1957	Independence Square, Kuala Lumpur (night and midnight declaration ceremony celebration); Stadium Merdeka, Kuala Lumpur (morning declaration ceremony celebration)		
1957–1984	Independence Square, Kuala Lumpur		
1985	Heroes Esplanade, Malacca Town, Malacca		
1986–1987	Independence Square, Kuala Lumpur		
1988	Tan Sri Dato' Haji Hassan Yunos Stadium, Larkin, Johor Bahru, Johor		
1989–1992	Independence Square, Kuala Lumpur		
1993	Independence Square, Kuching, Sarawak		
1994–1995	Independence Square, Kuala Lumpur		
1996	Likas Stadium, Likas, Kota Kinabalu, Sabah		
1997	Independence Square, Kuala Lumpur		
1998	Universiti Sains Malaysia Main Campus, Gelugor, George Town, Penang		
1999	Independence Square, Kuala Lumpur (from very first stroke of morning breakfast to very final last stroke of evening); Petronas Twin Towers, Kuala Lumpur City Centre, Kuala Lumpur (full-night grand opening ceremony): Petronas Twin Towers, Kuala Lumpur City Centre, Federal Territory of Kuala Lumpur officially formally formal grand opening inaugurating launching ceremonial took place began largest city and national capital, nationally and internationally by the 4th Prime Minister of Malaysia, Mahathir bin Mohamad in conjunction marking with Petroliam Nasional Berhad (Petronas) celebrated its twenty-fifth year of anniversary in silver jubilee anniversary party theme and Malaysia's celebrated its forty-second Independence Day on 31 August 1999.		
2000	Independence Square, Shah Alam, Selangor		
2001–2002	Independence Square, Kuala Lumpur		
2003	Putrajaya Square, Persiaran Perdana, Putrajaya	Guest of honour's grandstand is located at the Palace of Justice side, while the main stage is located at the Putrajaya Corporation Headquarters' Side.	
2004	Kemunting Square, Kuantan, Pahang		
2005	Putrajaya Square, Persiaran Perdana, Putrajaya	Guest of honour's grandstand is located at the Palace of Justice side, while the main stage is located at the Putrajaya Corporation Headquarters' Side.	
2006	Independence Square, Kuching, Sarawak		
2007–2008	Independence Square, Kuala Lumpur		
2009	Malaysian Houses of Parliament, Kuala Lumpur	Independence day parade held at a small scale due to the Swine flu pandemic and due to observation of Ramadan fasting.	
2010	Putra Indoor Stadium (now Unifi Arena) in Bukit Jalil, Kuala Lumpur	Due to observation of Ramadan fasting, only celebrations.	
2011–2017	Independence Square, Kuala Lumpur	2011 parade was the first in history to be held on Malaysia Day. (16 September) and not 31 August, due to observation of the second day of Hari Raya Aidilfitri celebrations falling on that date.	
2018–2019	Putrajaya Square, Persiaran Perdana, Putrajaya	Guest of honour's grandstand is located at the Palace of Justice side, while the main stage is located at the Putrajaya Corporation Headquarters' Side.	
2020–2021	National Heroes Square, Putrajaya	Due to the Movement Control Order SOP during the COVID-19 pandemic.	
2022	Independence Square, Kuala Lumpur		
2023–2025	Putrajaya Square, Persiaran Perdana, Putrajaya	Guest of honour's grandstand is located at the Palace of Justice side, while the main stage is located at the Putrajaya Corporation Headquarters' Side.	
2026	Putrajaya International Convention Centre, Putrajaya and Putrajaya Square, Persiaran Perdana, Putrajaya.	The Prime Minister address was relocated from Dataran Merdeka to Putrajaya International Convention Centre due to severe haze.	

== State-level and territorial-level parades ==
Apart from the larger national-level parade, there are also smaller parades held at state and territorial level, with diginitaries such as the state monarch or governor and the state's menteri besar, premier or chief minister and other government officials among the guests of honours. The proceedings of state-level and territorial-level parades are usually the same as the National-level parade, but without the flypast of armed forces and police aircraft (however, few of the state level parades do, like the one in Kuantan in Pahang). For parades with presence of state monarch or governor, the royal standard or governor's standard in front of the grandstand is unfurled. Only the Regimental unit Colour of the GOH battalion is dipped during the salute, while the military band plays the state anthem for both state monarch or governor, and additionally an abridged version of the National Anthem reserved only for state governor according to National Anthem Act 1968 (As with other state official functions). Selangor's state level parade, held in Shah Alam, is notable to be the only regularly scheduled state parade that is held every evening of 30 August, the eve of Independence Day.

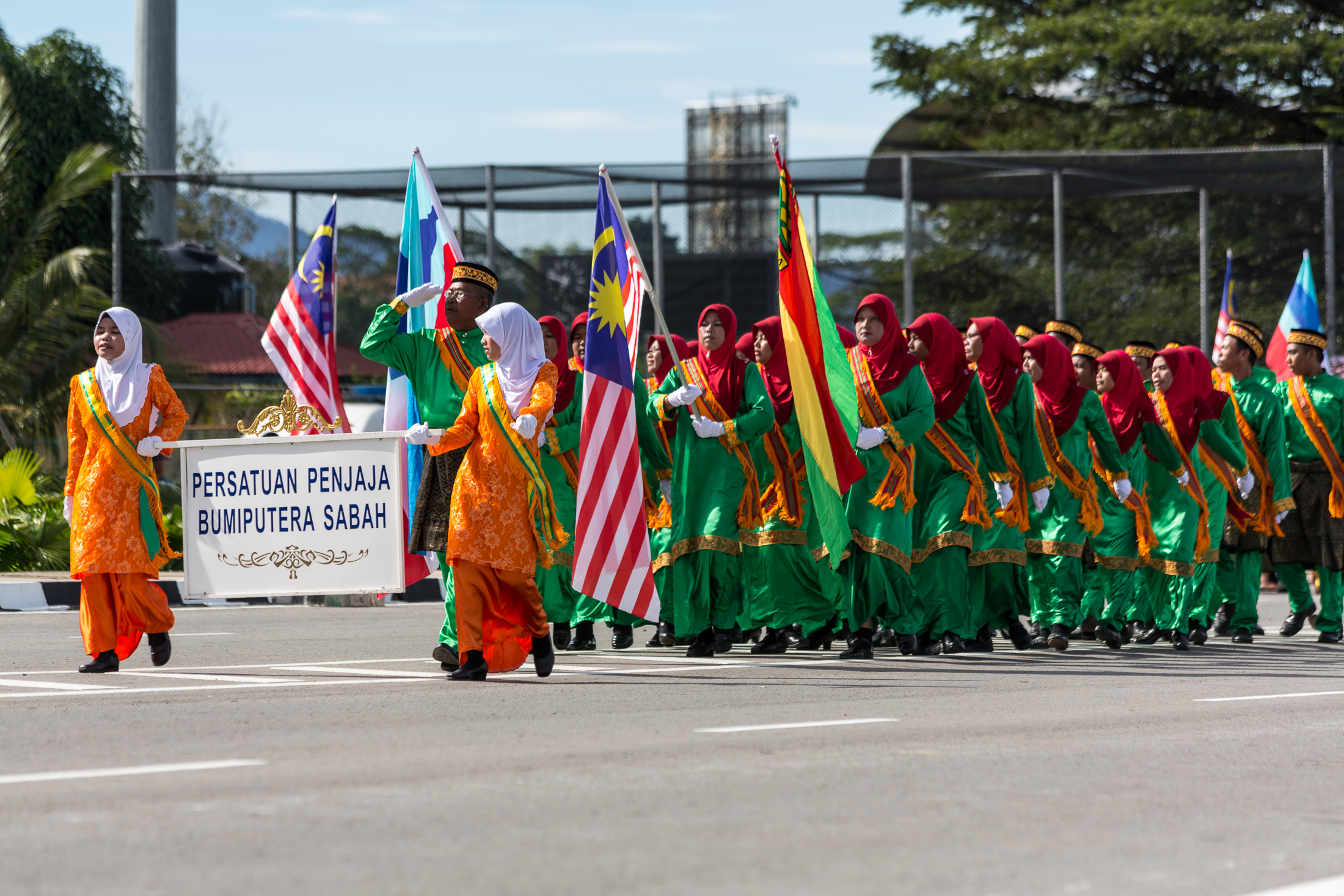
Parade during the 2013 Sabah state-level Independence Day Celebrations held in Likas, Kota Kinabalu on 31 August 2013. The entity in this image represented the Sabah Bumiputera Hawkers Association (Malay: Persatuan Penjaja Bumiputera Sabah).

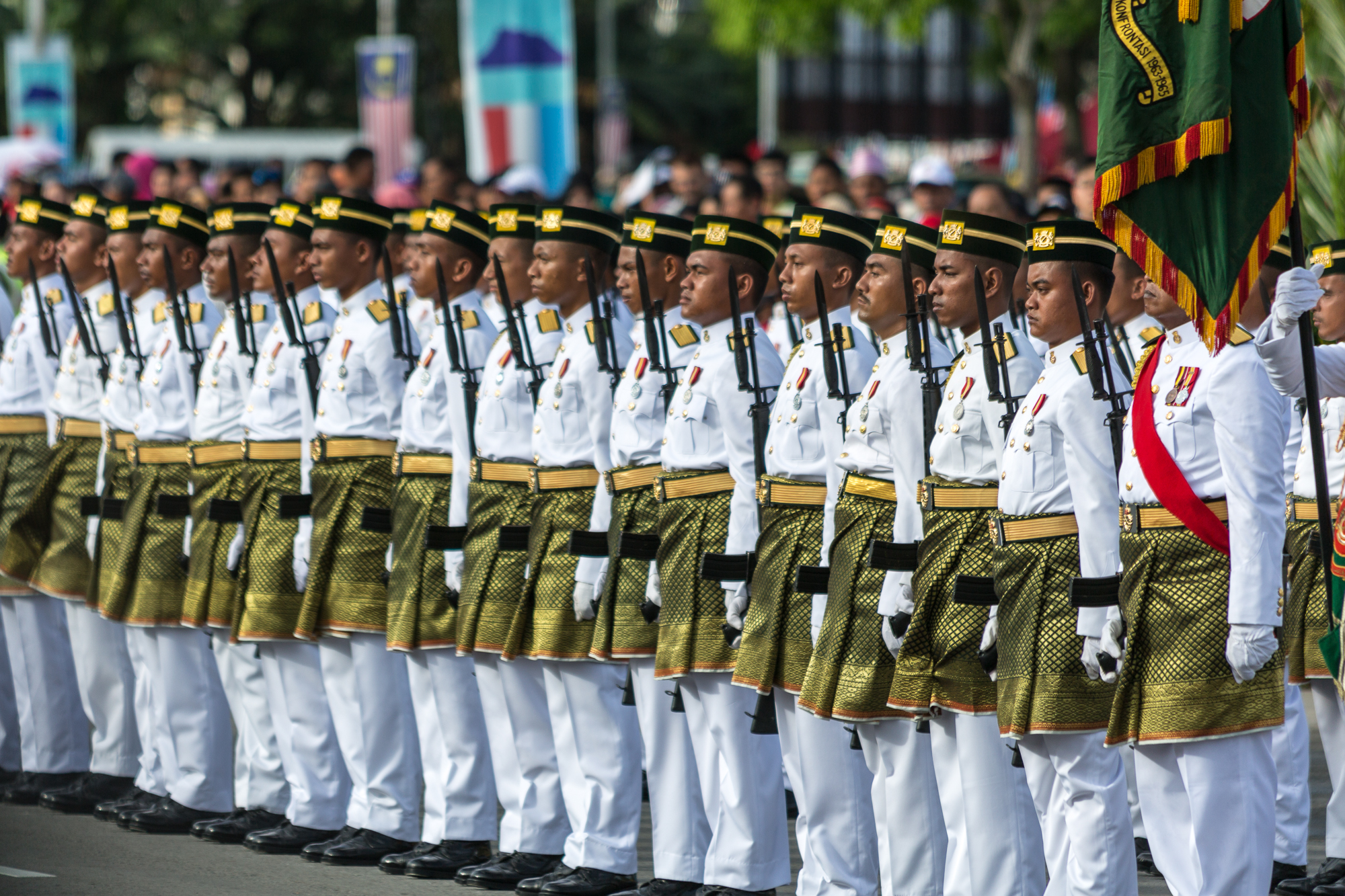
Guards of honour from the Royal Malay Regiment in Sabah during the 2013 Sabah state-level Independence Day Celebrations.

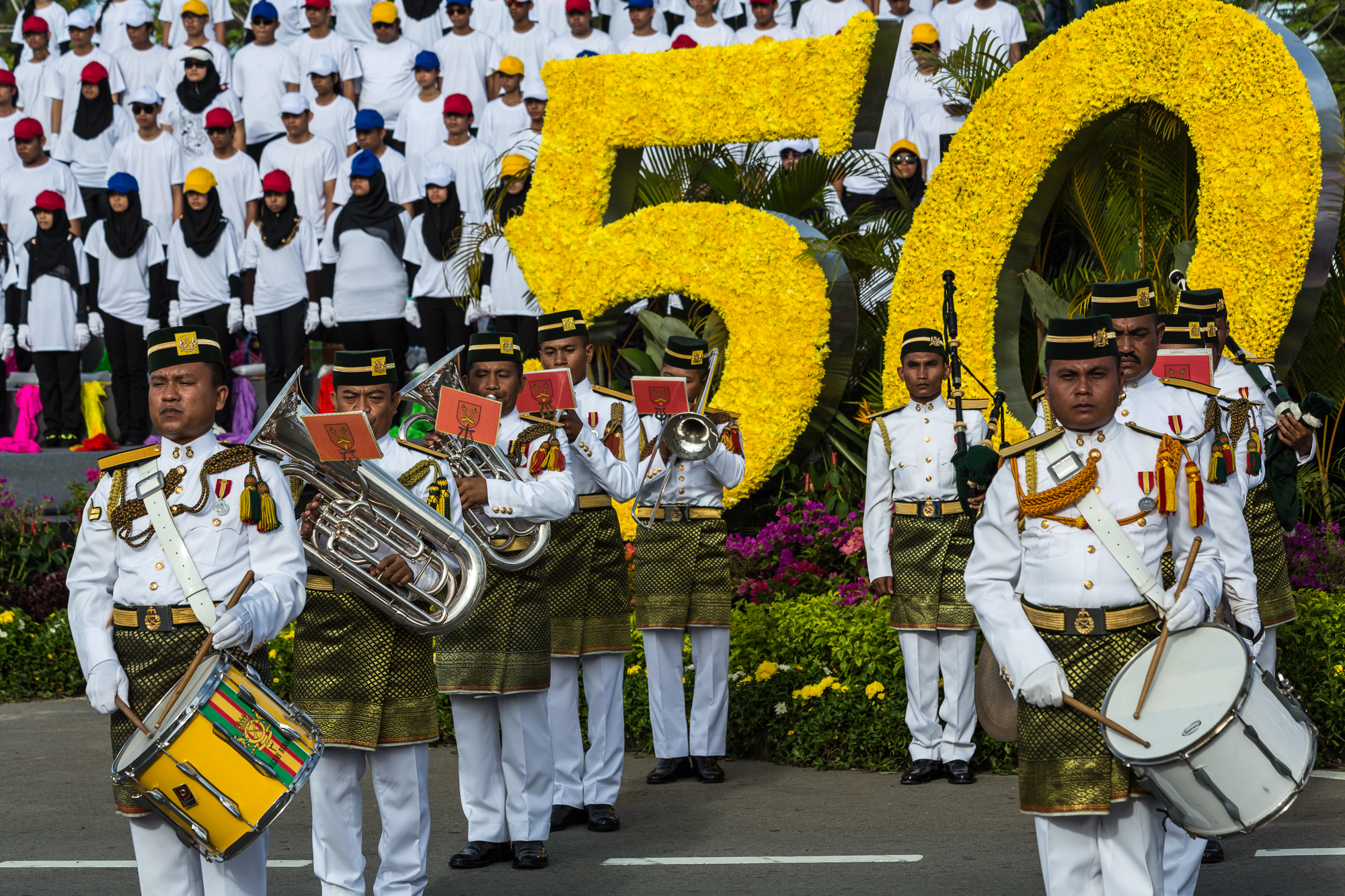
Military Band plays Sabah Governor's Salute during the 2013 Sabah state-level Independence Day Celebrations.

== See also ==
- Independence Day (Malaysia)
- Singapore National Day parade
