= Ahmadshah Abdullah =

Malaysian civil servant (1946–2025)

Allahyarham Tun Datuk Seri Panglima Ahmadshah Abdullah SMN SPDK DMK DP PGDK ASDK KMN JP
- أحمد شاه عبدﷲ
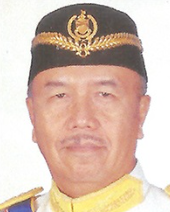
- Tun Ahmadshah Abdullah in his official UiTM Pro-Chancellor's cloak

9th Yang di-Pertua Negeri of Sabah
- In office 1 January 2003 – 31 December 2010
- Chief Minister: Chong Kah Kiat; Musa Aman
- Preceded by: Sakaran Dandai
- Succeeded by: Juhar Mahiruddin

Personal details
- Born: 9 December 1946 Inanam, Jesselton, North Borneo
- Died: 20 May 2025 (aged 78) Kota Kinabalu, Sabah, Malaysia
- Spouse: Toh Puan Datuk Seri Panglima Dayang Masuyah Awang Japar

Ahmadshah bin Abdullah (9 December 1946 – 20 May 2025) was a Malaysian civil servant who served as Yang di-Pertua Negeri (Governor) of the state of Sabah from 2003 to 2010. He was a Pro-Chancellor of MARA University of Technology.

== Education ==
Ahmadshah began his education at Government Primary School Darau, Menggatal in 1952 and ended his secondary school session in 1967 at La Salle Secondary School, Tanjung Aru, Kota Kinabalu. He received a Diploma in Development Administration from South Devon College in the United Kingdom and Bachelor of Science (Political Science) from Indiana State University in the United States.

== Career ==
Ahmadshah started his career as a customs officer at the Royal Customs and Excise Department, Kota Kinabalu on 1 March 1968. He was appointed Executive Officer (Rural) and was moved to Beaufort District Office as Assistant District Officer (Rural) on 10 November 1969. He was seconded to the National Paddy and Rice Board as Chief Officer from April 1979 until July 1983.

He also worked as Secretary of State Public Service Commission (1983), Dakwah Officer of Sabah Islamic Affairs Council (October 1986 to January 1988), Secretary of the Islamic Council of Sabah (January 1988 to June 1994), Secretary of Internal Affairs and Research Office (1994 to 1995) and Director of the State Public Service Department (December 1995 to March 1998). He served as Deputy State Secretary (Administration) from 21 March 1998 to 8 December 2002.

On 1 January 2003, he was sworn in as the ninth Yang di-Pertua Negeri of Sabah. He served two full terms and stepped down on 31 December 2010.

== Personal life and death ==
Ahmadshah was married to Hajah Dayang Masuyah binti Awang Japar (1948–23 March 2020) and the couple were blessed with three sons and a daughter as well as nine grandchildren.

Ahmadshah died in Kota Kinabalu on 20 May 2025, at the age of 78.

== Honours ==
=== Honours of Malaysia ===
- Malaysia
  - Grand Commander of the Order of the Defender of the Realm (SMN) – Tun (2003)
  - Officer of the Order of the Defender of the Realm (KMN) (1997)
- Kedah
  - Member of the Supreme Order of Sri Mahawangsa (DMK) – Dato' Seri Utama (2008)
- Sabah
  - Grand Commander of the Order of Kinabalu (SPDK) – Datuk Seri Panglima (2004)
  - Commander of the Order of Kinabalu (PGDK) – Datuk (1993)
- Sarawak
  - Knight Grand Commander of the Order of the Star of Hornbill Sarawak (DP) – Datuk Patinggi

Political offices
Preceded by Sakaran Dandai	Yang di-Pertua Negeri of Sabah; 2003–2010	Succeeded by Juhar Mahiruddin
