= Sang Sapurba =

Figure in the Malay Annals

Sri Maharaja Sang Sapurba Paduka Sri Trimurti Tri Buana, (1245–1316) also known as Sri Nila Pahlawan, is a figure in the Malay Annals and Tambo Minangkabau highly revered as the legendary great ancestor of some of the major dynasties of the Malay world: Singapura, Malacca, Pahang, Johor, Perak, Kelantan, Terengganu and Siak Sri Indrapura. Legend has it that after his accession to Seguntang Hill with his two younger brothers, Sang Sapurba enters into a sacred covenant with Demang Lebar Daun the native ruler of Palembang, which laid the basis of the proper relationship between the Malay rulers and the subjects. The legendary sword believed to be carried by the king, the Cura Si Manjakini, now forms part of the royal regalia of the Perak Sultanate, whose rulers are said directly descended from the king. Details of the Sang Sapurba stories are mainly composed of folklore and legends, and thus his historical existence is debated and disputed by modern historians. Even so, as anthopology professor de Jong argued in her article The Character of Malay Annals, the stories of the Malay Annals could have been realistically mixed with historical figures and events.

== Legend ==
Tradition in the Malay Annals hold that the founder of the major line of rulers in the Malay world was a prince named Sang Sapurba who alleged to be the descendant of Dhul-Qarnayn. Sang Sapurba, then known as Sri Nila Pahlawan first revealed himself with his younger brothers, Sri Krishna Pandita and Sri Nila Utama, upon the sacred hill of Seguntang in the hinterland of Palembang. The name of the princes varied in different versions of the Malay Annals. In Winstedt's version, they are known as Bichitram, Paladutani dan Nilatanam, while in Abdullah's version, they are Bichitram Syah, Nila Pahlawan dan Kama Pandita. Two young women who dwelt upon the hill, Wan Empuk and Wan Malini, are said to have seen a great light shining through the darkness of night. On ascending the hill in the morning they found that their rice crops had transformed the grain into gold, the leaves into silver, the stalks into golden brass. Proceeding further, they came across three young men, the eldest of whom was mounted on a silver white bull and was dressed as a king, while the two younger, his brothers, bore a sword, a lance and a signet that indicated sovereign power. The two women were greatly astonished at the refined appearance and elegant apparel of the young men, and thought that they must be the cause of the phenomenon which had appeared in their rice grounds. The curious young women immediately inquired who they were, where they came from and whether they were spirits or fairies. The eldest prince replied that they were neither spirits nor fairies, but that of men and they are princes from the line of the Great Alexander seeking his inheritance on earth. Then, Wan Empuk and Wan Malini asked what proofs they could produce of the truth of this relation, Nila Pahlawan said that let the crown he is wearing serves an evidence of descent and if any farther proof wanting, consider the phenomenon which the women have seen on their rice grounds. Then out of the mouth of the bull there issued a sweet-voiced herald, who at once proclaimed in Sanskrit language, the eldest prince to be a king bearing the title of 'Sang Sapurba Trimurti Tri Buana'.

In Tambo Minangkabau, the arrival of Sang Sapurba with his assistant Cati Bilang Pandai, is accompanied by four people who are represented by the Harimau Campo, Kucing Siamese, Kambing Hutan and Anjing Mu'alim. These names may also indicate the regional origin of the attendants. On arrival in the Minangkabau region, the local ruler, Datuk Suri Dirajo, married Sang Sapurba to his younger sister Indo Jalito. The Sapurba was crowned king with the title Maharajadiraja, after defeating Sikati Muno, an evil person who came from across the Indian Ocean to the west. Even though Sapurba was crowned king, he was only a symbol. The one who holds the reins of government power in Minangkabau remains Datuk Suri Dirajo. The Sapurba then built the government center in Lagundi Nan Baselo which refers to the Pariangan (Parhyangan) area.

== The Covenant ==
The newly installed sovereign afterwards descended from the hill of Seguntang into the great plain watered by the Palembang river, where he married Wan Sendari, the daughter of the local chief, Demang Lebar Daun, and was everywhere accepted as ruler of the land. Prior to his marriage, Sang Sapurba made the famous pact with Demang Lebar Daun, who abdicated in favour of him:

Demang Lebar Daun said, "Your Highness, the descendants of your humble servant shall be the subjects of your Majesty's throne, but they must be well treated by your descendants. If they offend, they shall not, however grave be their offence, be disgraced or reviled with evil words: if their offence is grave, let them be put to death, if that is in accordance with the dvine law. And the king replied, "I agree to give the undertaking for which you ask: but I in my turn require an undertaking from you, sir. " And when Demang Lebar Daun asked what the undertaking was, the king answered, "that your descendants shall never for rest of time be disloyal to my descendants, even if my descendants oppress them and behave evilly. " And Demang Lebar Daun said, "Very well, your Highness. But if your descendants depart from the terms of the pact, then so will mine. " And Sang Sapurba replied, "Very well, I agree to that covenant."

At a later date Sang Sapurba is said to have crossed the great central range of Sumatra into the Minangkabau Highlands, where one of his warriors, Permasku Mambang, slew the great serpent Saktimuna using his legendary sword, Cura Si Manjakini, and was made the king of a grateful people and the founder of the long line of Princes of Minangkabau.

== Royal dynasties ==
A. Samad Ahmad's version of the Malay Annals identified Sri Tri Buana who reigned in Palembang and the founder of ancient Singapura as the youngest brother of Sang Sapurba, Sri Nila Utama. In A. Samad Ahmad's version, Sang Sapurba was said to have reigned only in Minangkabau. On the other hand, Shellabear and Leyden's versions noted that Sang Nila Utama who reigned in Bintan and later founded ancient Singapura was the son of Sang Sapurba. The Misa Melayu and Silsilah Perak that contains comprehensive genealogical tree of the Sultans of Perak agreed with Shellabear and Leyden's versions, tracing the lineage of the rulers of Perak directly from Sang Sapurba. If these versions of the Malay Annals and the Perak text are to be taken into account, the line of rulers descended from Sang Sapurba should have begun with Sang Nila Utama who founded the Kingdom of Singapura in 1299. Four generations of rulers reigned over the island kingdom before the last ruler, known in certain accounts as Parameswara, fled after a Majapahit invasion in 1398. In 1400, Parameswara reached the mouth of Bertam River in the Malay Peninsula, where he established Melaka Sultanate. During the reign of Mansur Shah of Melaka (r. 1459–1477), an heir apparent named Raja Muhammad whose mother was a captured princess of Pahang, was banished for committing murder and went into exile. He was then proclaimed and installed as Sultan of Pahang in 1470. The Portuguese invasion of Melaka in 1511 caused a major split of the royal house when Muzaffar Shah the son of Mahmud Shah of Melaka (r.1488–1511) was invited by the people of Perak to rule the state. Another son, Alauddin Riayat Shah II established the Johor Sultanate to succeed Melaka in 1528.

In 1636, the Achehnese installed a prince from Siak to the throne of Perak following the demise of Sultan Salehuddin Shah (r.1630–1635) in exile in Aceh. The new Sultan who reigned as Muzaffar Shah II (r. 1636–1654) also claimed descent from a branch of Sang Sapurba dynasty in Siak. He married Fatima Puteh the elder daughter of Raja Muda of Pahang, Raja 'Abdu'llah by his wife, Putri Perak, who in turn was the granddaughter of Sultan Mansur Shah I of Perak (r. 1549–1577). Earlier in 1623, Pahang was united with the crown of Johor and the rulers from Melaka dynasty continued to reign in the state until 1688, when the Bendahara of Johor effectively consolidated the state as his personal fief.

The royal line of Sang Sapurba was finally ended in Johor when Mahmud Shah II of Johor (r. 1685–1699) was assassinated by Megat Seri Rama, popularly known as Laksamana Bintan, leaving behind no male heir. As a result, Bendahara Abdul Jalil declared himself the next Sultan of Johor. Upon ascending the throne, the new Sultan Abdul Jalil IV killed all the wives of Sultan Mahmud to avoid the possibility of any future claims to the throne. However, according to the Hikayat Negeri Johor (Chronicles of the State of Johor) and the Pahang Manuscripts, a wife by the name of Cik Apung the daughter of Laksamana managed to escape to Minangkabau and gave birth to Raja Kechil. Less than two decades later in 1717, Raja Kechil would assemble a fleet from Minangkabau and succeed temporarily in ousting Sultan Abdul Jalil's successor Sultan Sulaiman and gain the Johor Sultanate, basing his legitimacy on the claim that he was the post-humous son of Sultan Mahmud Shah II. However, Bugis mercenaries that assisted him in this campaign changed sides and he was eventually forced to flee to Siak, where he founded Siak Sultanate.

Family Tree of Sang Sapurba

Sang Sapurba
Kingdom of Singapura
Sri Tri Buana; Singapura^{(1)} r. 1299-1347
Sri Wikrama; Wira; Singapura^{(2)} r. 1347-1362	Tun Perpatih; Pramuka; Berjajar; Bendahara of Singapura^{(1)}
Sri Rana; Wikrama; Singapura^{(3)} r. 1362-1375
Sri Maharaja; Singapura^{(4)} r. 1375-1389
Malacca; Sultanate
Iskandar; Singapura^{(5)} r. 1389-1398; Melaka^{(1)} r. 1402-1414	Tun Perpatih; Besar
Megat; Iskandar; Melaka^{(2)} r. 1414-1424	♀ Tun Ratna; Sendari	Mani Purindan
Muhammad; Melaka^{(3)} r. 1424-1444	♀ Tun Ratna; Wati	Radin Anum; B. S. A. D^{(2)}
Abu Syahid; Melaka^{(4)} r. 1444-1446	Muzaffar; Melaka^{(5)} r. 1446-1459	♀ Raja Tua	Tun Perpatih; Sedang; B. S. R^{(3)} r. 1444-1445
Mansur; Melaka^{(6)} r. 1459-1477	Tun Ali; B. S. N. D^{(4)} r. 1445-1456	♀ Tun Kudu	Tun Perak; B. P. R^{(5)} r. 1456-1498
Pahang; Sultanate
Ahmad I Pahang^{(2)} r. 1475-1495	Muhammad; Pahang^{(1)} r. 1470-1475	Alauddin I Melaka^{(7)} r. 1477-1488	♀ Tun Senaja	Tun Mutahir; B. S. M^{(7)} r. 1500-1510	Tun Tahir	Tun Pikrama; B. P. T^{(8)} r. 1510-1511
Bendahara of Johor
Mansur I Pahang^{(4)} r. 1495-1519	♀ Raja Putri; Olah	Mahmud I Pahang^{(5)} r. 1519-1530	Abdul Jamil; Pahang^{(3)} r. 1495-1512	♀ Raja Wati	Mahmud; Melaka^{(8)} r. 1488-1511, 1513-1528	♀ Tun Fatimah	Tun Hassan	Tun Khoja; Ahmad; B. P. R^{(1)} r. 1513-1520
Perak; Sultanate	Johor; Sultanate
Raja Ahmad	♀ Raja Puspa; Dewi	Muzaffar; Pahang^{(6)} r. 1530-1540	Zainal Abidin; Pahang^{(7)} r. 1540-1555	Muzaffar I Perak^{(1)} r. 1528-1549	Ahmad; Melaka^{(9)} r. 1511-1513	Alauddin II; Johor^{(1)} r. 1528-1564	Tun Mad Ali	Tun Isap; Berakah; B. P. T^{(2)} r. 1520-?
Mansur II; Pahang^{(8)} r. 1555-1560	Abdul Jamal; Pahang^{(9)} r. 1560-1575	Abdul Kadir; Pahang^{(10)} r. 1560-1590	Abdul Jalil II; Johor^{(4)} r. 1571-1597	♀ Raja Fatimah	Muzaffar II; Johor^{(2)} r. 1564-1570	Tun Jenal	Tun Mahmud; B. T. N. W^{(3)}	♀ Daughter
Raja Asif	♀ Raja Putih	Abdul Ghafur; Pahang^{(12)} r. 1592-1614	Ahmad II; Pahang^{(11)} r. 1590-1592	Mansur I Perak^{(2)} r. 1549-1577	Alauddin III; Johor^{(5)} r. 1597-1615	Abdul Jalil I Johor^{(3)} r. 1570-1571	Tun Isap; Misai; B. S. M^{(5)} r. ?-1571
Raja Mahmud	Raja Abdullah	Alauddin; Pahang^{(13)} r. 1614-1615	Tajul Ariffin; Perak^{(4)} r. 1584-1594	Mukaddam; Perak^{(6)} r. 1603-1619	Abdul Jalil III; Johor^{(7)} r. 1623-1677	♀ Raja Putri; Kamarliah	Abdullah; Johor^{(6)} r. 1615-1623	♀ Tun Genggang	Tun Ahmad; B. P. R^{(6)} r. 1571-1586
Muzaffar II; Perak^{(10)} r. 1636-1653	♀ Raja Putri; Fatima Putih	Ahmad; Tajuddin; Perak^{(3)} r. 1577-1584	Mahmud I Perak^{(8)} r. 1627-1630	Raja Bajau; Yamtuan Muda of Pahang r. 1641-1676	Tun Sri; Lanang; B. P. R^{(7)} r. 1586-1615
Mahmud; Iskandar; Perak^{(11)} r. 1653-1720	Raja Mansur	Raja Inu	Salehuddin; Perak^{(9)} r. 1630-1636	Ibrahim; Johor^{(8)} r. 1677-1685	Tun Mad Ali; B. P. R^{(10)} r. 1642-?
Alauddin; Perak^{(12)} r. 1720-1728	Muzaffar III; Perak^{(13)} r. 1728-1754	Muhammad; Perak^{(14)} r. 1744-1750	Alauddin; Perak^{(5)} r. 1594-1603	Mansur II; Perak^{(7)} r. 1619-1627	Mahmud II; Johor^{(9)} r. 1685-1699	Tun Habib; Abdul Majid; B. S. M^{(12)} r. 1677-1697
Sultanate of Siak Sri; Indrapura
Iskandar; Zulkarnain; Perak^{(15)} r. 1752-1765	Mahmud II; Perak^{(16)} r. 1765-1773	Alauddin; Mansur; Perak^{(17)} r. 1773-1786	Ahmaddin; Perak^{(18)} r. 1786-1806	Abdul Jalil; Johor^{(11)} r. 1718-1722; Siak^{(1)} r. 1722-1746
Abdul Malik; Mansur; Perak^{(19)} r. 1806-1825	Raja Inu; Muhammad; Saleh	Raja Abdul; Rahman	Muhammad; Siak^{(2)} r. 1746-1760	Abdul Jalil; Siak^{(4)} r. 1761-1766
Abdullah; Muazzam; Perak^{(20)} r. 1825-1830	Raja Ahmad	Shahabuddin; Perak^{(21)} r. 1830-1851	Abdullah; Muhammad I Perak^{(22)} r. 1851-1857	Ismail; Siak^{(3)} r. 1760-1766, 1779-1781	Muhammad Ali; Siak^{(5)} r. 1766-1779	♀ Tengku; Embung	Sayyid Osman
Jaafar; Perak^{(23)} r. 1857-1865	Raja Alang; Iskandar	Ali; Perak^{(24)} r. 1865-1871	Yusuf; Perak^{(27)} r. 1886-1887	Yahya; Siak^{(6)} r. 1781-1791	Raja Hussein	Ali; Siak^{(7)} r. 1791-1811
Raja Musa	Idris I Perak^{(28)} r. 1887-1916	Abdullah; Muhammad II; Perak^{(26)} r. 1874-1877	♀ Raja; Mandak	Raja Syed; Hitam	Ibrahim; Siak^{(8)} r. 1811-1827
Abdul Aziz; Perak^{(31)} r. 1938-1948	Abdul Jalil; Perak^{(29)} r. 1916-1918	Iskandar; Perak^{(30)} r. 1918-1938	Ismail; Perak^{(25)} r. 1871-1874	Ismail; Siak^{(9)} r. 1827-1864	Kasim I Siak^{(10)} r. 1864-1889
Yusuf; Perak^{(32)} r. 1948-1963	Idris II; Perak^{(33)} r. 1963-1984	Hasyim; Siak^{(11)} r. 1889-1908
Azlan; Perak^{(34)} r. 1984-2014	Kasim II; Siak^{(12)} r. 1915-1946
Terengganu; Sultanate
Nazrin; Perak^{(35)} r. 2014-present	Abdul Jalil IV; Johor^{(10)} r. 1699-1718	Zainal Abidin I Terengganu^{(1)} r. 1708-1733
Sulaiman I Johor^{(12)} r. 1722-1760	Tun Abbas; B. S. M r. 1721	Mansur I Terengganu^{(2)} r. 1733-1794
Pahang; Kingdom	Temenggong of Johor
Abdul Jalil V Johor^{(13)} r. 1760-1761	Tun; Abdul Majid; B. P. R^{(1)} r. 1770-1802	Tun; Abdul Jamal; T. P. R r. 1757-1802	Zainal Abidin II; Terengganu^{(3)} r. 1794-1808
Ahmad; Johor^{(14)} r. 1761-1770	Mahmud III; Johor^{(15)} r. 1770-1811	Tun; Muhammad; B. S. M^{(2)} r. 1802-1803	Tun Koris; B. P. R^{(3)} r. 1803-1806	Tun; Abdul Hamid; T. P. M r. 1803-1806	Ahmad I Terengganu^{(4)} r. 1808-1830	Abdul; Rahman; Terengganu^{(5)} r. 1830-1831	Mansur II; Terengganu^{(7)} r. 1831-1836
Riau-Lingga; Sultanate
Hussein; Johor^{(17)} r. 1819-1835	Abdul; Rahman I Johor^{(16)} r. 1811-1819; Riau^{(1)} r. 1818-1832	Tun Ali; B. S. M^{(4)} r. 1806-1857	Abdul Rahman; T. S. M r. 1806-1825	Daud; Terengganu^{(6)} r. 1831	Omar; Terengganu^{(8)} r. 1831, 1839-1876	Tengku Mahmud	Muhammad I Terengganu^{(9)} r. 1836-1839
Modern Pahang
Ali Iskandar; Johor^{(18)} r. 1835-1855	Muhammad II; Riau^{(2)} r. 1832-1841	Sulaiman II; Riau^{(4)} r. 1857-1883	Tun; Muhammad; Tahir; B. S. M^{(5)} r. 1857-1863	Ahmad; B. S. M^{(6)} r. 1863-1881; Sultan^{(1)} r. 1881-1909	Tun Ibrahim; T. S. M r. 1841-1855; Maharaja (de facto) of Johor r. 1855-1862	Ahmad II; Terengganu^{(10)} r. 1876-1881
Modern Johor
Mahmud IV; Riau^{(3)} r. 1834-1857	Abdullah; Pahang^{(3)} r. 1917-1932	Mahmud II; Pahang^{(2)} r. 1909-1917	Abu Bakar; T. S. M r. 1862-1868; Maharaja r. 1868-1886; Sultan^{(1)} r. 1886-1895	Zainal Abidin III; Terengganu^{(11)} r. 1881-1918
♀ Tengku; Embung; Fatimah	Raja; Muhammad; Yusuf; Yamtuan Muda of Riau r. 1858-1899	Abu Bakar; Pahang^{(4)} r. 1932-1974	Tengku; Muhammad	Ibrahim; Johor^{(2)} r. 1895-1959	Muhammad II; Terengganu^{(12)} r. 1918-1920	Sulaiman; Terengganu^{(13)} r. 1920-1942	Ismail; Terengganu^{(15)} r. 1945-1979
Abdul; Rahman II; Riau^{(5)} r. 1883-1911	Ahmad; Pahang^{(5)} r. 1974-2019	♀ Tengku; Afzan	Ismail; Johor^{(3)} r. 1959-1981	Ali; Terengganu^{(14)} r. 1942-1945	Mahmud; Terengganu^{(16)} r. 1979-1998
Iskandar; Johor^{(4)} r. 1981-2010	Mizan; Zainal Abidin; Terengganu^{(17)} r. 1998-present
Abdullah; Pahang^{(6)} r. 2019-present	♀ Tunku; Azizah	♀ Raja Zarith; Sofiah	Ibrahim; Johor^{(5)} r. 2010-present	Tengku; Muhammad; Ismail
Tengku; Hassanal; Ibrahim	Tunku Ismail

== Bibliography ==
- Ahmad, A. Samad (1979), Sulalatus Salatin (Sejarah Melayu), Dewan Bahasa dan Pustaka, ISBN 983-62-5601-6, archived from the original on 2013-10-12
- Abdul Rahman, Haji Ismail; Abdullah Zakaria, Ghazali; Zulkanain, Abdul Rahman (2011), A New Date on the Establishment of Melaka Malay Sultanate Discovered (PDF), Institut Kajian Sejarah dan Patriotisme ( Institute of Historical Research and Patriotism )
- Andaya, Leonard Y. (2008), Leaves of the Same Tree: Trade and Ethnicity in the Straits of Melaka, University of Hawaii Press, ISBN 978-0-8248-3189-9
- Brakel, L. F; Balfas, M.; M. Taib, Othman; Gonda, J.; Rangkuti, B.; Lumbera, B.; Kahler, H. (1976), Handbuch der Orientalistik: Literaturen, Abschn. 1, Brill Academic Publishers, ISBN 90-04-04331-4
- Hussain, Othman (2005), The Characteristics of the Malay Historiography (PDF), UTHM Institutional Repository, archived from the original (PDF) on 2015-08-16
- Leyden, John (1821), Malay Annals (translated from the Malay language), Longman, Hurst, Rees, Orme and Brown
- Ooi, Keat Gin (2004), Southeast Asia: a historical encyclopedia, from Angkor Wat to East Timor, ABC-CLIO, ISBN 1-57607-770-5
- Ooi, Keat Gin (2009), Historical Dictionary of Malaysia, Scarecrow Press, ISBN 978-0-8108-5955-5
- Sabrizain, Sejarah Melayu - A History of Malay peninsula
- Siti Hawa, Haji Salleh (2010), Malay Literature of the 19th century, Institut Terjemahan Negara Malaysia, ISBN 978-983-068-517-5
- The Straits Times (1939), Sword of Alexander in State Regalia (2 March)
- Windstedt, Richard Olaf (1938), "The Malay Annals or Sejarah Melayu", Journal of the Malayan Branch of the Royal Asiatic Society, XVI, The Branch
