= Family tree of Pahangese monarchs =

The following is family tree of the Malay monarchs of Pahang, from the establishment of the Old Pahang Sultanate to the present day.

== House of Melaka-Pahang ==
House of Melaka-Pahang
- Kerabat Diraja Melaka-Pahang

Details
- First monarch: Muhammad
- Last monarch: Mahmud II
- Formed: 1470

House of Melaka-Pahang

House of Melaka	Dewa Sura; Old Pahang r. ?–1454
Mansur; Melaka r. 1456–1477	♀ Wanang Seri; Lela Wangsa
Old Pahang; Sultanate
Ahmad I^{(2)} r. 1475–1495	Muhammad^{(1)} r. 1470–1475
Mansur I^{(4)} r. 1512–1519	♀Raja Putri; Olah	Mahmud^{(5)} r. 1519–1530	Abdul Jamil^{(3)} r. 1495–1512	♀ Raja Wati
Raja Ahmad	♀ Raja Puspa; Dewi	♀ Raja Kesuma; Dewi	Muzaffar^{(6)} r. 1530–1540	Zainal Abidin^{(7)} r. 1540–1555
Abdul Jalil II; Johor r. 1571–1597	Mansur II^{(8)} r. 1555–1560	Abdul Jamal^{(9)} r. 1560–1590	Abdul Kadir; Alauddin^{(10)} r. 1560–1590
Raja Asif; Siak	♀Raja Putih
Alauddin III; Johor r. 1597–1615	Raja Mahmud	♀ Putri Bongsu; Chandra; Dewi	Ahmad II^{(11)} r. 1590–1592	♀ a Bruneian princess	♀ Raja Putri; Zaharah of Brunei	Abdul Ghafur^{(12)} r. 1592–1614	♀ Raja Ungu; Pattani r. 1624–1635
Abdul Jalil III^{(14)} (Note: Ruler of Johor-Pahang-Riau-Lingga) r. 1615–1617 r. 1623–1641	Iskandar; Thani; Aceh r. 1610–1641	♀ Raja Putri; Kamarliah	Abdullah; Johor r. 1615–1623	Raja Abdullah	Alauddin^{(13)} r. 1614–1615	♀ Raja Kuning; Pattani r. 1635–1688
Raja Bajau (Note: Yamtuan Muda of Pahang ('Regent of Pahang'), within Johor-Pahang-Riau-Lingga empire) r. 1641–1677
Muzaffar II; Perak r. 1636–1654	♀Raja Putri; Fatima Puteh
House of Siak-Perak	Ibrahim (Note: Ruler of Johor-Pahang-Riau-Lingga) r. 1677–1685
Mahmud II (Note: Ruler of Johor-Pahang-Riau-Lingga) r. 1685–1699

== House of Bendahara-Pahang ==
In 1699, following the accession of Abdul Jalil IV from the Bendahara dynasty, as the tenth Sultan of Johor, Pahang was established as a special province of Bendahara (hereditary grand viziers of Johor empire), and ruled by a succession of Bendahara, from Tun Mas Anum (r. 1699–1717) to Tun Hassan (r. 1748–1770). With the decline of Johor from the late 18th century, and the involvement of foreign powers, the Bendahara consolidated their power in Pahang and became increasingly independent. During the reign of Tun Abdul Majid, a semi-independent state Pahang Kingdom was established with Bendahara acquiring similar status as a Raja ('king'). By 1884, the sixth Raja Bendahara, Tun Ahmad was formally proclaimed Sultan.

House of Bendahara-Pahang

House of Bendahara
Tun Habib; Abdul Majid; B.S.M r. 1677–1697
Abdul; Jalil IV (Note: Ruler of Johor-Pahang-Riau-Lingga); B.P.R r. 1697–1699 r. 1699–1718	Zainal; Abidin I Terengganu r. 1725–1733	Tun; Mas Anum; B.S.M r. 1699–1717	Tun; Abdullah; B.P.R r. 1717–1717	Tun; Abdul Jamal; B.S.M r. 1717–1717	Tun; Tahir; T.P.R r. 1722–1750
Sulaiman; Johor^{(11)} r. 1722–1760	Tun; Abbas; B.S.M r. 1721–1721	Tun; Husain; B.P.R r. 1721–1748
Pahang Kingdom
Tun; Hassan; B.S.M r. 1748–1770	Tun; Abdul Jamal; T.P.R r. 1757–1802	Tun; Abdul Majid; B.P.R^{(1)} r. 1770–1802
Tun; Muhammad; B.S.M^{(2)} r. 1802–1803	Tun; Koris; B.P.R^{(3)} r. 1803–1806
Tun Ali; B.S.M^{(4)} r. 1806–1847
Pahang; Sultanate
Tun Mutahir; B.S.M^{(5)} r. 1847–1863	Ahmad; B.S.M^{(6)} r. 1863–1881; Sultan^{(1)} r. 1881–1914
Mahmud^{(2)} r. 1914–1917	Abdullah^{(3)} r. 1917–1932	Tengku; Muhammad; Tengku Panglima; Perang
Abu Bakar^{(4)} r. 1932–1974
Ahmad^{(5)} r. 1974–2019; YDP Agong VII r. 1979–1984	Tengku Afzan; Tengku Ampuan r. 1974–1988; Raja Permaisuri Agong VII r. 1979–1984
House of Temenggong
Abdullah^{(6)} r. 2019–present YDP Agong XVI r. 2019–2024	Tunku Azizah; Aminah; Maimunah; Iskandariah; Tengku Ampuan r. 2019–present Raja Permaisuri Agong XVI r. 2019–2024
Tengku Hassanal Ibrahim; Alam Shah; Tengku Mahkota

== Bibliography ==
- Ahmad Sarji Abdul Hamid (2011), The Encyclopedia of Malaysia, vol. 16 - The Rulers of Malaysia, Editions Didier Millet, ISBN 978-981-3018-54-9
- Linehan, William (1973), History of Pahang, Malaysian Branch Of The Royal Asiatic Society, Kuala Lumpur, ISBN 978-0710-101-37-2
