= Pahang Sultanate =

Old sultanate of Pahang, Malaysia

Pahang Sultanate كسلطانن ڤهڠ Kesultanan Pahang
- 1470–1623 (Personal union with Johor)
- Status: Vassal state of the Malacca Empire (1470–1511)
- Capital: Pekan
- Common languages: Classical Malay
- Religion: Sunni Islam
- Government: Monarchy
- Sultan
  - 1470–1475: Muhammad Shah (first)
  - 1475–1495: Abdul Jamil Shah I
  - 1495–1512: Abdul Jalil (reigned jointly)
  - 1495–1519: Mansur Shah I (reigned jointly)
  - 1519: Abdul Jamal Shah I
  - 1519–1530: Mahmud Shah I
  - 1530–1540: Muzaffar Shah
  - 1540–1555: Zainal Abidin Shah
  - 1555–1560: Mansur Shah II
  - 1560–1575: Abdul Jamal Shah II (reigned jointly)
  - 1560–1590: Abdul Kadir Alauddin Shah (reigned jointly)
  - 1590–1592: Ahmad Shah
  - 1592–1614: Abdul Ghafur Muhiuddin Shah
  - 1614–1615: Alauddin Riayat Shah
  - 1615–1617: Abdul Jalil Shah III
- History
  - Established: 1470
  - Acehnese invasion: 1617
  - Union with Johor: 1623 (Personal union with Johor)
- Currency: Tampang, native gold and silver coins
Preceded by	Succeeded by
Malacca Sultanate; Old Pahang Kingdom	Johor Empire
- Today part of: Malaysia

The Pahang Sultanate (Malay: Kesultanan Pahang, Jawi: كسلطانن ڤهڠ) also referred as the Old Pahang Sultanate, as opposed to the modern Pahang Sultanate, was a Malay Muslim state established in the eastern Malay Peninsula in the 15th century. At the height of its influence, the sultanate was an important power in Southeast Asia and controlled the entire Pahang basin, bordering the Pattani Sultanate to the north and the Johor Sultanate to the south. To the west, its jurisdiction extended over parts of modern-day Selangor and Negeri Sembilan.

The sultanate has its origin as a vassal of Melaka, with its first sultan being a Malaccan prince, Muhammad Shah, himself the grandson of Dewa Sura, the last pre-Malaccan ruler of Pahang. Over the years, Pahang grew independent from Malaccan control and at one point even established itself as a rival state to Malacca until the latter's demise in 1511. During this period, Pahang was heavily involved in attempts to rid the peninsula of the various foreign imperial powers; Portugal, the Netherlands and Aceh. After a period of Acehnese raids in the early 17th century, Pahang entered into the amalgamation with the successor of Melaka, Johor, when its 14th sultan, Abdul Jalil Shah III, was crowned the 7th Sultan of Johor. After a period of union with Johor, it was eventually revived as a modern sovereign Sultanate in the late 19th century by the Bendahara dynasty.

== Origin ==
=== Melakan conquest of Pahang ===
Muzaffar Shah, the 5th Sultan of Melaka who reigned from 1445 to 1458 refused to acknowledge the suzerainty of Ligor over his country. The Ligorians, in assertion of their claim, sent an invading army led by Awi Chakri, overland to Melaka. The invaders, who were aided by auxiliaries from the Pahang Kingdom, followed the old route by the Tembeling, Pahang and Bera rivers. They were easily defeated and fled back by the same route. Subsequently, they attempted a naval invasion, and were again beaten. Muzaffar Shah then conceived the idea of checking Ligorian pretensions by attacking the Ligor vassal state, Pahang. An expedition was organised by Muzaffar's son, Raja Abdullah and was personally led by the Melakan Bendahara Tun Perak with two hundred ships, proceeded to Pahang and conquered it in 1454. The last ruler of the kingdom, Dewa Sura was captured and carried together with his daughter Putri Wanang Seri to Melaka.

The Sultan of Melaka appointed Sri Bija Diraja Tun Hamzah, the commander of the army in the conquest, as the governor of Pahang, and permitted him the privilege, once he was out of Melakan waters, of using six of the eight instruments that made up nobat band, and of having a pair of fringed umbrellas borne over him. Sri Bija Diraja accordingly proceeded to Pahang which he governed for several years. Once a year he visited Melaka to show respect to his sovereign.

In the year that Pahang was conquered, Raja Abdullah married Putri Wanang Seri, the daughter of Dewa Sura, whose name had been changed Putri Lela Wangsa, probably on conversion to Islam. By her he had two sons Raja Ahmad and Raja Muhammad.

=== The Sepak Raga incident ===
Muzaffar Shah died around 1458 and was succeeded by Raja Abdullah who was styled Sultan Mansur Shah. As his sons grew up, the new ruler paid special favour to Raja Muhammad and designated him as his successor. When Raja Muhammad was about fifteen years old he was riding past a group of boys who were engaged in a sepak raga game, when a misdirected ball kicked by Tun Besar, the Bendahara's son displaced Muhammad's headdress. In a rage he drew his kris and killed Tun Besar.

The Bendahara's people flew to arms to avenge Tun Besar's death, but were restrained by the Bendahara who warned them against any measures that might be construed as treason against the Sultan. However, the Bendahara and his people vowed that the Raja Muhammad should never rule over them. Sultan Mansur, after hearing their complaint, agreed that Raja Muhammad should be exiled from Melaka. He recalled Sri Bija Diraja from Pahang and commanded him to escort Muhammad to that country and install him as their Sultan.

== History ==
=== Founding ===
Accompanied by Tun Hamzah who was appointed Bendahara for the new kingdom, Seri Akar Raja as his Hulubalang, a Penghulu Bendahari, a Temenggung, and a hundred youths and a hundred maidens of noble family, Raja Muhammad proceeded to Pahang where he was installed as sultan around 1470 with the title Sultan Muhammad Shah. The boundaries of his kingdom extended from Sedili Besar to the south up to border with Terengganu to the north. The first Melakan ruler of Pahang, appears to have settled at Tanjung Langgar in Pekan, the old seat of the pre-Melakan rulers.

The events of this period are obscure. There is reason to believe that Raja Ahmad, the elder brother of the newly appointed Sultan of Pahang, who had also been passed over for the succession to the Melaka throne, as a consolation was installed heir to the Pahang Sultanate by his father in Melaka and proceeded to the country between the 1470 and 1475.

On 17 September 1475, Sultan Muhammad Shah died and was buried at Langgar on the Pahang Tua. The inscription on his tomb gives his name, descent and the date of his death. According to the commentaries of Afonso de Albuquerque, Sultan Mansur of Melaka had, by a daughter of the king of Pahang, a son who was poisoned. It is likely that this conjecture was in reference to Sultan Muhammad.

=== Early period ===
The 17th century Bustan al Salatin records that Muhammad was succeeded by his elder brother Raja Ahmad who took the title Sultan Ahmad Shah. He married a daughter of Tun Hamzah and by her he had a son Raja Mansur. The new ruler had been passed over for the succession to the Melaka throne twice, first by his younger brother Muhammad, and second by a younger half-brother Raja Hussain, who with the title Sultan Alauddin, succeeded his father Sultan Mansur in 1477. As a result, relations between Pahang and Melaka deteriorated greatly during his reign.

Shortly after his accession, he ordered the killing of Tun Telanai, the hereditary chief of neighbouring Terengganu, as he had visited Melaka without his knowledge and paid obeisance to Sultan Alauddin. In 1488, Sultan Alauddin of Melaka died at Pagoh on the Muar River after being poisoned, it was claimed that the rulers of Pahang and Indragiri were responsible. The ruler of Inderagiri suggested that Raja Merlang, who had married Alauddin's half sister Raja Bakal and settled in Melaka, was behind the poisoning.

Sultan Alauddin was succeeded by his son Sultan Mahmud with whom his royal uncle of Pahang continued to quarrel with. The Malay Annals tell a story of Tun Teja, a daughter of a Bendahara of Pahang who was famed for her beauty and betrothed to the Pahang Sultan. A Melakan envoy to Pahang, on his return to his country, spread the fame of Tun Teja's beauty. Sultan Mahmud, enamoured of the picture of Tun Teja that had been presented to him by his chief, promised any reward, however great, to the man who would abduct the Pahang girl and bring her to Melaka. Tun Teja was won over by the Melakan Laksamana and was taken to Melaka. The Sultan of Pahang, enraged and humiliated, prepared to declare war on Melaka but was later calmed down by his chiefs.

The insults put upon the Sultan and his inability to avenge them brought him into disgrace with his people, and made his position untenable. The events took place around 1494. The Malay Annals records that Abdul Jamil was the Pahang ruler concerned, but historians such as Linehan and Khoo suggested the events occurred during the reign of his uncle, Sultan Ahmad. Sultan Abdul Jamil abdicated in favour of his young son Raja Mansur who assumed the title Sultan Mansur Shah. The new Sultan was placed under the guardianship of his uncles, sons of the first sultan. In describing Abdul Jamil's life after the abdication, the Malay Annals noted: "his highness went upstream for so long as the royal drums could be heard; when he came to Lubuk Pelang there he resided, and the sound of the drums was no longer heard. He went into religious seclusion; he it is whom people call Marhum Syeikh.

Between 1488 and 1493, Raja Fatimah, a royal daughter of Alauddin of Melaka and a full sister of Sultan Mahmud, had married a Pahang prince. The annals state that her husband was Abdul Jamil. She died, childless, on 7 July 1495 and was buried at Pekan Lama in a graveyard known as Ziarat Raja Raden. After Abdul Jamil's abdication, it appears that Abdul Jalil, the eldest son of the first ruler under the style of Sultan Abdul Jalil, reigned jointly with Abdul Jamil's son, Sultan Mansur. The prince was younger, and Jamil and his brothers seem to have exercised some measure of guardianship over him in the early years of his reign. The period saw the restoration of ties between Pahang and Melaka.

=== Middle period ===
In 1500, the ruler of the Nakhon Si Thammarat Kingdom, known in Malay tradition as Ligor, invaded Pahang through Kelantan and the Tembeling with a large army, on the instructions of the King of Ayutthaya. The common threat made the people of Pahang ignore their squabbles with Melaka. Sultan Mahmud sent a Melakan army, under Bendahara Seri Maharaja to help Pahang. Among the leaders of the expedition were Laksamana Khoja Hassan and the Hulubalang Sang Setia, Sang Naya, Sang Guna, Sang Jaya Pikrama, and Tun Biajid. The forts at Pekan were strengthened and the people mobilized. There was delay in completing the main fortification called the 'Fort of Pahang', also known as Kota Biram, which stood on the site of the modern Sultan Abu Bakar Museum, but it ended up being completed before the invasion. The people composed a song, the first line of which ran: "the fort of Pahang, the flames devour". The invaders made only a half-hearted attempt on Pahang, and were soon put to fight with severe losses. They were forced to return by the route which they had come. This was the last Siamese invasion of Pahang.

In 1511, the capital of Melaka was attacked and conquered by the Portuguese Empire, prompting a retreat of Sultan Mahmud's court to Pahang by the Penarikan route. There, he was welcomed by Abdul Jalil. The deposed ruler stayed a year in the country during which time he married one of his daughters, whose mother was a Kelantanese princess, to Sultan Mansur. Between 1511 and 1512, while Mahmud was in Pahang, Sultan Abdul Jalil died and was buried at Pekan in Ziarat Raja Raden. In the inscription on his tomb, his name given as Abdul Jalil and the date of his death is 917 AH. It is recorded in de Albuquerque's commentaries, that Sultan Mahmud died of grief in Pahang. The Portuguese must have mistaken Abdul Jamil, who died exactly at the date, for Sultan Mahmud. After Abdul Jalil's death Sultan Mansur was the sole ruler. He was killed by all of his hulubalang between 1512 and 1519, for committing adultery with a widow of his father.

Mansur was succeeded by his first cousin, Raja Mahmud, another son of Muhammad Shah, who may be the prince who is described as "the son of the original ruler of Pahang" (anak Raja Pahang raja yang asal) in the Malay Annals. The new Sultan's first royal wife was his first cousin, Raja Olah. After his accession to the throne, he married a second wife, Raja Khadija, one of the daughters of his cousin Marhum Kampar, around 1519. This marriage, which took place at Bintan was designed to strengthen Marhum Kampar position in his fight against the Portuguese. Mahmud was installed sultan by his new father-in-law.

However, Pahang, for an unknown reason, forged an unusual relations with Portuguese during Sultan Mahmud's reign. According to Os Portugueses em Africa, America e Oceania, in 1518, Duarte Coelho visited Pahang and stated that the Sultan of Pahang agreed to pay a cup of gold as an annual tribute to Portugal. This act was thought to be a sign friendship shown by the sultanate, but was regarded by the Portuguese as a sign submission. Manuel de Faria e Sousa relates that until 1522 the Sultan of Pahang had sided with the Portuguese, but seeing that the tide of fortune had turned against them, he, too became their enemy. Ignorant of this change, de Albuquerque sent three ships to Pekan for provisions, where two of his captains and thirty men were killed. The third made his escape but was killed with all his men at Java. Simon Abreu and his crew were also killed on another occasion. Valentyn further records that in 1522 several Portuguese who had landed at Pahang, in ignorance that the sultan there was son-in-law to the Sultan of Johor, were killed, many others were compelled to embrace Islam, while those who refused to do so were tied to the mouth of cannons and blown to pieces.

In 1523, the Sultan of Johor again attacked Melaka with the ruler of Pahang as his ally, and gained a victory over the Portuguese in the Muar River. The Laksamana attacked the shipping in the roads of Melaka, burnt one vessel and captured two others. During the battle, Martim Afonso de Sousa arrived to assist, relieved the city, and pursued the Laksamana into Muar. He proceeded to Pahang, destroyed all the vessels in the river and killed over six hundreds people in retaliation for the assistance given by their ruler to the Sultan of Johor. Some were carried into slavery. A detailed account of Portuguese operations in Pahang during 1522 and 1523 is given by Fernão Lopes de Castanheda. In 1525, Pedro Mascarenhas attacked Sultan of Johor's Bintan, Pahang sent a fleet with two thousand men to help the defenders. The force arrived at the mouth of the river on the day on which the bridge was destroyed. He despatched a vessel with Francisco Vasconcellos and others to attack the Pahang force which began to retreat. Sultan Mahmud of Pahang appears to have ruled in Pahang all through these events. His namesake of Melaka-Bintan, Marhum Kampar died in 1528, and was succeeded by a son, the fifteen year old Alauddin Shah II. The young ruler visited Pahang around 1529 and married a relative of the Pahang ruler. Sultan Mahmud of Pahang died about 1530, and left two sons Raja Muzaffar and Raja Zainal, with the former succeeding him as Sultan Muzaffar Shah.

In 1540, Fernão Mendes Pinto gave an account of his voyage with a Portuguese merchant vessel in Pahang. During their stay in Pekan, the reigning sultan was killed and a mob attacked their resident and seized their goods which amounted fifty thousand ducats in gold and precious stones alone. The Portuguese escaped and proceeded to Pattani. They made representations to the King of Pattani, and he gave them permission to attack Pahang boats in the Kelantan River– then a province of Pattani– to recover goods up to the value what had been lost. The Portuguese took the king at his word, fitted out an expedition, and proceeded to the Kelantan River where they attacked and captured three junks owned by Pahang merchants, killing seventy four people, with a loss of only three of their men. The sultan, who, according to Pinto, was killed in 1540 appears to have been Sultan Muzaffar. He was succeeded by his younger brother Raja Zainal, who assumed the title Sultan Zainal Abidin Shah.

Pahang formed part of the force of three hundred sailed-ships and eight thousand men which assembled in the Johor River for a reprisal attack on Pattani, but later negotiations settled the dispute. In 1550, Pahang sent a fleet to help Johor and Perak in the siege of Melaka but the Portuguese warships harassed the harbours of Pahang so that the attackers had to retreat to defend their own capital. Sultan Zainal Abidin died around 1555 and was succeeded by his eldest royal son, Mansur Shah II, who around the time of his accession married his first cousin, Purti Fatimah, a daughter of Sultan Alauddin Riayat Shah II of Johor (who died at Aceh in 1564). By her, he had a daughter Putri Putih also popularly known as Putri Kecil Besar, and a son, Raja Suboh. There is no further record on the fate of his son, but the daughter would become an ancestor of the future ruling families of Aceh and Perak. Mansur II was killed around 1560 in a war against Javanese Hindus in southern Pahang and was succeeded by his brother Raja Jamal who took the title Sultan Abdul Jamal Shah. During his reign, Raja Biajid and Raja Kasab –sons of Sultan Khoja Ahmad of Siak– came to Pahang. Raja Kasab married Putri Putih, a daughter of Mansur II. Raja Kasab's children by Putri Putih were Raja Mahmud, and five daughters, the youngest of which was Putri Bongsu Chandra Dewi. Raja Mahmud was the father of Raja Sulong who ultimately became Muzaffar Shah II of Perak.

Abdul Jamal was murdered in 1560 and was succeeded by his half-brother Raja Kadir who came to the throne with the title of Sultan Abdul Kadir Alauddin Shah. During his reign, Pahang had a brief period of cordial relations with the Portuguese. In 1586, Abdul Kadir sent a block of gold bearing quartz as a present to the Portuguese Governor of Malacca. According to the Portuguese, gold was still commonly mined in quarries across Pahang and sold in great quantity in Melaka. However, this relationship with Portuguese was discontinued by Ahmad II, Abdul Kadir's only son by a royal wife, who was a boy when he died in 1590. According to the Bustan al Salatin, Ahmad II reigned for only a year as he was too young to govern the country and was then replaced by his eldest half-brother, Abdul Ghafur, who had been born to a commoner. Abdul Ghafur who took the title of Sultan Abdul Ghafur Muhiuddin Shah had married in 1584, Ratu Ungu, a sister of Ratu Hijau, the Queen of Pattani. He also formed marriage connections with sultans of Brunei. The Perak Annals relate that he also betrothed his eldest son to a grand daughter of Sultan of Perak. During his reign, Sultan Abdul Ghafur attacked the Portuguese and simultaneously challenged the Dutch presence in the Strait of Malacca. Nevertheless, in 1607, Pahang not only tolerated the Dutch, but even cooperated with them in an attempt to oust the Portuguese.

=== Late period ===
In 1607, the Dutch Empire began their trade mission to Pahang led by the merchant Abraham van den Broeck. On 7 November 1607, a Dutch warship with Admiral Cornelis Matelief de Jonge onboard dropped anchor at Kuala Pahang. Earlier in 1606, Matelief, in an attempt to establish the Dutch power in the Strait of Malacca, was defeated twice by the Portuguese in the First Siege of Malacca and the Battle of Cape Rachado. Matelief, who had come to solicit the assistance of Pahang against the Portuguese, had an audience with the Sultan. The ruler emphasized the importance of alliance between Johor and neighbouring states, and added that he would try to provide two thousand men in order to bring the war to a successful conclusion. At the Sultan's request, Matelief sent him a gunner to test a cannon piece that was being cast for Raja Bongsu of Johor. The people of Pahang also manufactured cannons which were better than those of Java but inferior to those of the Portuguese.

Matelief requested the Sultan to send two vessels to the Straits of Sabon to join the Johor vessels already there as soon as possible, and to despatch two more vessels to Penang waters to strengthen the Kedah and Achinese fleets to cut the off the Portuguese food supplies.

Abdul Ghafur tried to reforge the Johor-Pahang alliance to assist the Dutch. However, a quarrel which erupted between him and Alauddin Riayat Shah III, resulted in Johor declaring war on Pahang. In September 1612, the Johor army overran the suburbs of Pekan, which caused many deaths in the city. Pahang defeated Johor in 1613 with the aid of the Sultan of Brunei. Abdul Ghafur's son, Alauddin Riayat Shah ascended to the throne in 1614. He was replaced a year later by a relative, Raja Bujang who was installed with the support of the Portuguese following a pact between the Portuguese and the Sultan of Johor. Raja Bujang's appointment was not accepted by Aceh, which was at war with the Portuguese. Aceh launched attacks on Pahang which forced Raja Bujang to flee to Lingga in 1617.

Pahang entered a nominal dynastic union with Johor in 1623, when Johor's Abdullah Ma'ayat Shah died and Raja Bujang emerged as the new ruler of Johor-Pahang, installed as Sultan Abdul Jalil Shah Riayat Shah III. From 1629 to 1635, Pahang, operating independently from Sultan Abdul Jalil III appeared determined to oust the Acehnese, allying itself with the Dutch and Portuguese whenever it was convenient to do so. In 1637, the appointment of Iskandar Thani to the throne of Aceh, led to the signing of a peace treaty between Pahang and Aceh at Bulang Island in the Riau-Lingga islands.

In 1648, Abdul Jalil III attacked Pahang in an attempt to reassert his position as Ruler of Johor-Pahang. Aceh eventually abandoned its claim over Pahang in 1641 – the same year Portuguese Malacca fell to the Dutch. With the decline of Aceh, Johor-Pahang gradually extended its suzerainty over the Riau-Lingga islands, creating the Johor-Pahang Empire.

== Administration ==
The system of administration adopted by the sultanate is largely modelled on that of Melaka. The Malay Annals state that during the installation of Muhammad Shah as the first sultan in 1470, he was accompanied by Tun Hamzah who was appointed Bendahara for the new kingdom, by Seri Akar Raja as his Hulubalang, a Penghulu Bendahari, and a Temenggung. By the time of Sultan Abdul Ghafur, a sophisticated social hierarchy had been established, of which the most important were the offices of four major hereditary chiefs who were granted their respective fiefs to govern on behalf of the sultan. The system survived until modern times.

Pahang was governed by the set of laws that derived from the formal legal text of Melaka consisted of the Undang-Undang Melaka and the Undang-Undang Laut Melaka. The laws as written went through an evolutionary process and were shaped by three main influences, namely the early non-indigenous Hindu/Buddhist tradition, Islam and the indigenous adat. By the early 17th century, during the reign of Sultan Abdul Ghafur, Pahang developed the set of laws into its own version, called Hukum Kanun Pahang, that contain among others, detailed provisions on ceremonial matters, settlement of social conflicts, maritime matters, Islamic laws and general matters.

=== List of sultans of Pahang ===
#	Personal name		Reign	Posthumous name	
#	Rumi	Jawi	Reign	Rumi	Jawi
1	Muhammad Shah	محمد شاه	1470–1475	Marhum Langgar	مرحوم لڠݢر
2	Abdul Jamil Shah	عبد الجامل شاه	1475–1495	Marhum Syeikh	مرحوم شيخ
3	Abdul Jalil	عبد الجليل شاه	1495–1512	Marhum Ziarat	مرحوم زيارة
4	Mansur Shah I	منصور شاه	1495–1519		
5	Abdul Jamal Shah I	عبد الجامل شاه	1519		
6	Mahmud Shah	محمود شاه	1519–1530	Marhum di Hilir	مرحوم دهيلير
7	Muzaffar Shah	مظفر شاه	1530–1540	Marhum Tengah	مرحوم تڠه
8	Zainal Abidin Shah	زين العابدين شاه	1540–1555	Marhum di Bukit	مرحوم دبوكيت
9	Mansur Shah II	منصور شاه	1555–1560	Marhum Syahid	مرحوم شهيد
10	Abdul Jamal Shah II	عبد الجامل شاه	1560–1575		
11	Abdul Kadir Alauddin Shah	عبد القدير علاء الدين شاه	1575–1590		
12	Ahmad Shah II	احمد شاه	1590–1592		
13	Abdul Ghafur Muhiuddin Shah	عبد الغفور محى الدين شاه	1592–1614	Marhum Pahang	مرحوم ڤهڠ
14	Alauddin Riayat Shah	علاء الدين رعاية شاه	1614–1615		
15	Abdul Jalil Shah III	عبد الجليل شاه	1615–1617; 1623–1677		

== Economy ==
Since the pre-Melakan era, the inland river-valley routes that crossed through Pahang formed a significant trading network linking the east and west coast of the peninsula. The inland attractions were threefold; first the presence of gold in the interior along the Tembeling and Jelai rivers, as well as in Kelantan to the north, second, the presence of tradable forest products, and of local people, the Orang Asli where were skilled at getting them, and lastly, the suitability of most of the state for long-distance travel, because of its relatively non-mountainous and open terrain.

The Tembeling Valley was the connecting link between the ports and the tin mining areas of the west coast and the Lebir Valley in southeast Kelantan; the latter led in turn to the Patani and Kra Isthmus region. This route involved the short overland stretch known as the Penarikan that allowed boats and their cargo to be dragged the few hundred metres between the headwaters of the Muar, flowing west, and the Serting River, flowing east into the Pahang, Jelai and Tembeling systems. The presence of a large group of Pahang merchants in Pattani was recorded in the account of Fernão Mendes Pinto in 1540.

The capital, Pekan, also served as the main trading port to the sultanate, frequented by both international and regional merchants. Despite intermittent diplomatic tensions between Pahang and Portuguese Malacca, the presence of Portuguese merchants in Pekan was mentioned in some accounts. There was also permanent settlement of Chinese miner-merchants in Pekan. The standard currency was the tin ingot known locally as tampang, and other native gold and silver coins. Tampang survived in Pahang until 1893. In their original form, tampang were solid slabs of tin, valued at their tin content, and were originally used as medium of exchange in the Melaka Sultanate. The Portuguese suppressed all Malay currency when they conquered Melaka in 1511, but this form persisted in some of the outlying Malay states, particularly Pahang.

The most important product of Pahang was gold. Its gold mines were considered the best and the largest in the peninsula. The gold traded with ancient Alexandria came from there. The peninsula as a whole was so well known as a source of gold the Ptolemy named it the Golden Chersonese. In 1586, Sultan Abdul Kadir sent a block of gold bearing quartz as a present to the Portuguese Governor of Malacca. As described in the 16th century's Portuguese account, gold was still commonly mined in quarries across Pahang and sold in great quantity in Melaka.

== Bibliography ==
- Ahmad Sarji Abdul Hamid (2011), The Encyclopedia of Malaysia, vol. 16 - The Rulers of Malaysia, Editions Didier Millet, ISBN 978-981-3018-54-9
- Benjamin, Geoffrey, Issues in the Ethnohistory of Pahang, Lembaga Muzium Negeri Pahang (Museum Authority of Pahang)
- Farish A Noor (2011), From Inderapura to Darul Makmur, A Deconstructive History of Pahang, Silverfish Books, ISBN 978-983-3221-30-1
- Khoo, Gilbert (1980), From Pre-Malaccan period to present day, New Straits Times
- Linehan, William (1973), History of Pahang, Malaysian Branch Of The Royal Asiatic Society, Kuala Lumpur, ISBN 978-0710-101-37-2
