= Ayutthaya invasions of the Malacca Sultanate =

Conflicts between Ayutthaya and Malacca

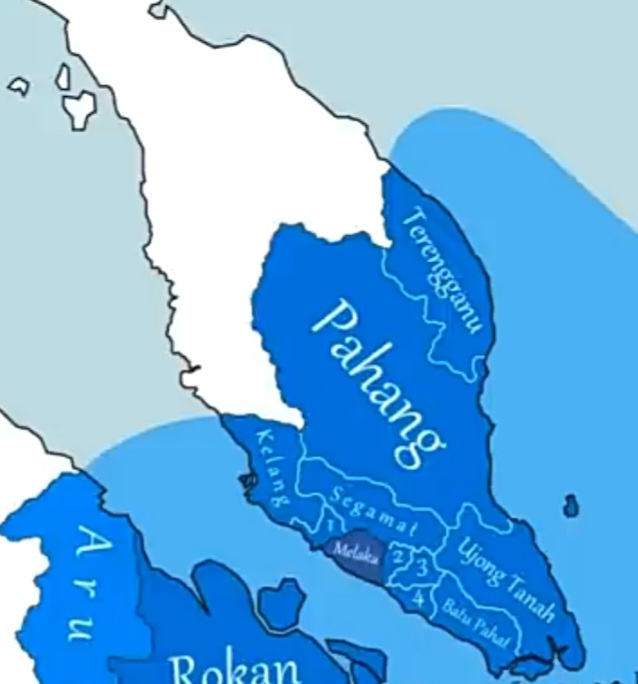
- Outcome of the conflict, c. 1459
Date	c. 1447, 1456, 1500
Location	Malay Peninsula
Result	Malaccan victory; Malacca predominates some of the rest of Malay Peninsula
Territorial changes	Malaccan annexation of Pahang and Kampar

Belligerents
Malacca Sultanate Pahang Sultanate	Ayutthaya Kingdom; Old Pahang Kingdom; Old Kedah Kingdom

Commanders and leaders
Muzaffar Shah # Mansur Shah; Tun Perak	Borommatrailokkanat; Bubunya; Awi Di Chu; Chau Pandan †; Dewa Sura (POW)

Strength
Unknown; 200 ships sent against the Old Pahang Kingdom	Unknown; probably heavy

Casualties and losses
Unknown	Heavy

The Ayutthaya invasions of the Malacca Sultanate were a series of conflicts in the 15th and early 16th centuries in which the Ayutthaya Kingdom attempted to subjugate the Malacca Sultanate.

Ayutthaya invaded Malacca several times during the century: once around 1447, once in 1456 and then twice in 1500. All invasions were repelled by Malacca.

== Prelude ==
The Malacca Sultanate established a tributary relationship with the Ming dynasty soon after its foundation at the turn of the 15th century. When Ayutthaya's growing power began to threaten Malacca, the Ming warned Ayutthaya that Malacca was a Ming vassal and should not be interfered with. By the time that its Ming protectors adopted an isolationist foreign policy in the mid-15th century, Malacca had won enough time to build up its own strength. When Muzaffar Shah became sultan in 1445 or 1446, he ended the tributary payments that the Sultanate had previously made to Ayutthaya.

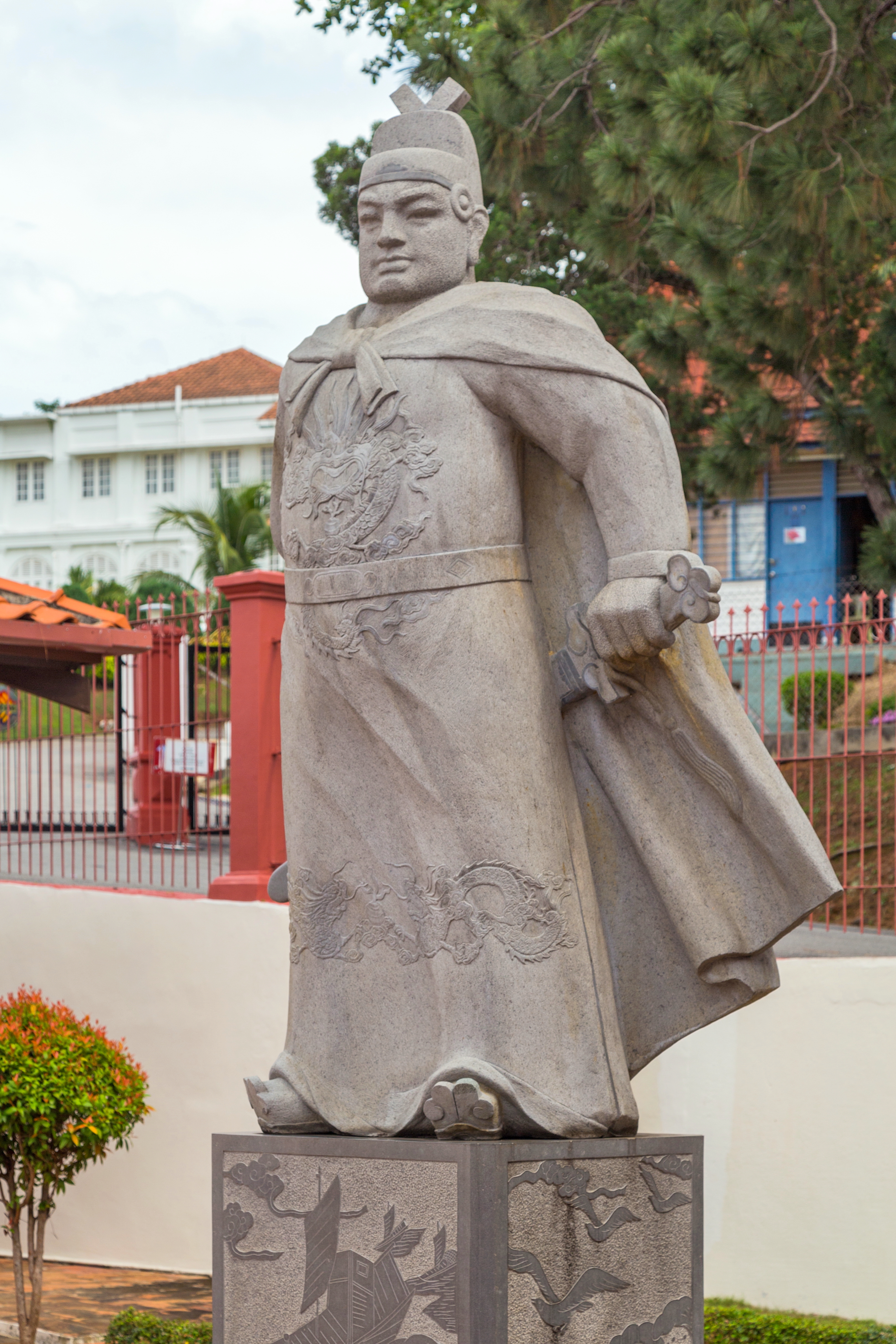
Monument indicating Zheng He at China-Malaysia Friendship Garden.

== 1447 and 1456 invasions ==
Ayutthaya began its first attack around 1447, which was ultimately thwarted by Malaccan forces led by Tun Perak.

The Battle of Batu Pahat took place in 1456, in which Ayutthayan forces were again defeated by Tun Perak's Malaccans. Following their defeat, some Ayutthayan commanders surrendered in Batu Pahat and were later sent to Singapore.

According to the History of Ming, in 1456 Muzaffar Shah sent a tribute to the Ming court with the intention of being invested as king. Historian G. E. Marrison posits that, if the Siamese and Chinese accounts of the period were accurate, Muzaffar may have refrained from seeking the recognition of the Ming court prior to this as a result of the conflicts between Malacca and Ayutthaya.

Between 1454 and 1459, (Note: Three possible dates are given, 1454 by William Linehan, and 1458 and 1459 by G. E. Marrison) Malacca conquered the old kingdom of Pahang from a Siamese (Note: The term "Siamese" was used by Malaccan Malays to denote the preceding rulers of Pahang regardless of whether they were of Thai heritage) prince bearing the title of Maharaja Dewa Sura, an Ayutthaya vassal. Mansur Shah, who ascended to the throne after his father Muzaffar Shah's death in 1459, subsequently married Dewa Sura's daughter, Wanang Sri. The administration of Malaccan Pahang was overseen by Sri Bija Diraja.

== 1500 invasions ==
In 1500, the Ayutthaya Kingdom and its vassal Nakhon Si Thammarat, also known as Ligor, invaded Malacca.

João de Barros's Décadas da Ásia, translated by the anthropologists P. E. de Josselin de Jong and H. L. A. van Wijk, states that Muzaffar Shah's son and successor Mahmud Shah of Malacca had renounced "all subservience to the king of Siāo" (Siam), which provoked a military response. The Ayutthaya king Ramathibodi II ordered the formation of an armada consisting of 200 ships that carried some 6,000 men, led by the poyoá of Ligor. The poyoá is recorded as the Raja of Ligor in William Shellabear's edition of the Malay Annals.

The armada was dispersed by a storm, resulting in a handful of ships reaching the outskirts of Malacca ahead of the rest of the fleet. Barros records that the Ayutthayans were greeted by Mahmud Shah, who declared his subservience to Ramathibodi II. Messengers were then sent to the rest of the armada informing them of this development, and that the poyoá "could proceed at his pleasure" while they awaited his arrival in Malacca.

However, upon being billeted, the Siamese sailors and soldiers were murdered, and a larger force of disguised Malaccans set out in the night to meet the Siamese armada. The poyoá, whose fleet was understrength, believed the disguised Malaccans to be his own forces and was routed.

A new armada accompanied by a land army, numbering 30,000 men combined, was formed to attack the Malaccans. This new force was ordered to attack the Pahang Sultanate en route, a Malaccan vassal led by Mahmud Shah's cousin, Mansur Shah I of Pahang. Owing to the Ayutthayans' desire for a hasty response, they were poorly organised and routed by local forces as they besieged Pahang. The Siamese king then prepared for a third invasion consisting of two separate forces, each with its own army and accompanying armada, with one to advance on Malacca through Kelantan and the other through Tenasserim. The capture of Malacca in 1511 by the Portuguese Empire rendered the planned third invasion unnecessary.

Differing slightly from de Barros's account, William Linehan's The History of Pahang (1936) mentions only one invasion by Siamese forces made using the Tembeling River that suffered severe casualties at the hands of a Malaccan force led by Laksamana Khoja Hassan.
