= Abdul Jamil Shah I of Pahang =

Abdul Jamil Shah عبد الجامل شاه
- Sultan of Pahang
- Reign: 1495–1512
- Predecessor: Ahmad Shah I
- Successor: Mansur Shah I
- Died: 1512; Pekan
- Spouse: Raja Fatima
Regnal name
- Paduka Sri Sultan Abdul Jamil Shah ibni al-Marhum Sultan Muhammad Shah
Posthumous name
- Marhum Ziarat
- House: Malacca
- Father: Muhammad Shah
- Religion: Sunni Islam

Sultan Abdul Jamil Shah I ibni Almarhum Sultan Muhammad Shah (died 1512) was the third Sultan of Pahang from 1495 to 1512. He was installed by Sultan Mahmud of Malacca in 1495 following the abdication of his uncle, Ahmad Shah I. Earlier, his cousin and son of Ahmad Shah, Mansur Shah succeeded his father at a young age. Abdul Jamil took the responsibility as a regent and exercised greater authority in the government. He reigned jointly with Mansur Shah until his death in 1512.

== Personal life ==
Sultan Abdul Jamil was known as Raja Abdul Jamil before his accession. He was the eldest of three sons of the first Sultan of Pahang, Muhammad Shah by his wife, Mengindra Putri, a Kelantanese princess, the granddaughter of Sultan Iskandar Shah of Kelantan (r. 1429–1467). His other siblings included Raja Ahmad and Raja Mahmud, the future Sultan Mahmud Shah.

According to the Malay Annals, Sultan Abdul Jamil was married to his first cousin, Raja Fatimah, the daughter of Sultan Alauddin of Malacca, and an elder sister of Mahmud Shah of Malacca. The Bustanus Salatin on the other hand, provides a different account, suggesting Raja Fatimah had married a different cousin, Sultan Mansur of Pahang. Historians seem to agree with the account in the Malay Annals, based on the discovery of the tomb of Raja Fatimah next to the tomb of Sultan Abdul Jamil in the Ziarat Raja Raden graveyard, Pekan.

== Reign ==
Following the abdication of his uncle, Ahmad Shah I who went into religious seclusion, and the succession of his cousin Raja Mansur as the new sultan in 1495, Raja Jamil took over guardianship of the young sultan. Since Pahang at that time was effectively a vassal of Malacca, Sultan Mahmud of Malacca had sent his minister Seri Dewa Raja to install his preferred ruler, and Raja Jamil was ultimately crowned sultan. As there were no indications that Mansur Shah was deposed, it is believed that both rulers reigned jointly from 1495.

The reign of the two sultans oversaw the restoration of ties between Pahang and Malacca, that had been marred with diplomatic tension during the reign of Ahmad Shah I. In 1500, the ruler of the Nakhon Si Thammarat Kingdom, known in Malay tradition as Ligor, on the instructions of his overlord Ramathibodi II of Ayutthaya, launched an overland invasion reaching Tembeling from Kelantan. Pahang and Malacca cooperated in facing the common threat. An army led by Bendahara Seri Maharaja was sent by Malacca to support the defence of Pahang. The forts at Pekan were strengthened, with the main fortification called 'Fort of Pahang' or 'Fort of Biram' constructed right before the invasion. The combined Pahangese and Malaccan forces managed to repel the invasion with the opposing side suffering heavy casualties and were forced to flee. It was the last Thai attempt to subjugate the southern Malay states.

In 1511, the capital of Malacca fell to the Portuguese Empire. The exiled Sultan Mahmud retreated to Pagoh, Muar before he was again defeated by the Portuguese forces and retreated further through the Penarikan route to Pahang, where he was cordially received by Sultan Abdul Jamil.

== Death ==
Between 1511 and 1512, while Sultan Mahmud was still in Pahang, Sultan Abdul Jamil died and was buried in the graveyard of Ziarat Raja Raden, Pekan. He was posthumously known as Marhum Ziarat ('the late ruler who was buried at Ziarat'). According to the 'Commentaries' written by Brás de Albuquerque, it was claimed that Sultan Mahmud was the one who died of grief in Pahang after his expulsion from Malacca. This however contradicts official records which state that Sultan Mahmud only died later in 1528 and was buried at Kampar, Sumatra where his grave is currently located. It can be inferred that the Portuguese must have mistaken Abdul Jamil for Sultan Mahmud.

The graveyard Ziarat Raja Raden is located in Pekan on the west bank of the Pekan River near the spot where it joins the Pahang River. It contains several graves belonging to the Pahangese royal family from the 15th to 16th centuries. The tombstone at the grave of Raja Fatimah was inscribed with her name and the date of her death, 15 Shawwal 900 AH (corresponds to 7 July 1495). The epitaph on Sultan Abdul Jamil's tomb, which is situated by the side of that of Raja Fatimah, reads :

This (is) the grave of the excellent and illustrious Abdul Jalil. Departed from this world to the everlasting world on the date nine hundred and seventeen. After the most excellent of men had departed to him befits prayer and virtuous salutations.

Until the 1970s, Abdul Jamil's grave was erroneously thought by locals to be that of the Sultan Abdul Jalil of Johor (Marhum Kuala Pahang) who was killed at Kuala Pahang in 1720. This is however, is very unlikely as the year shown on the tombstone was 917 AH (corresponds to 1511–1512).

== Ancestry ==
Ancestors of Abdul Jamil Shah I of Pahang

8. Sultan Muzaffar Shah of Malacca
4. Sultan Mansur Shah of Malacca
9. Raja Tua
2. Sultan Muhammad Shah of Pahang
10. Maharaja Dewa Sura of Pahang
5. Putri Wanang Sri Lela Wangsa
1. Paduka Sri Sultan Abdul Jamil Shah I of Pahang
12. Paduka Sri Sultan Iskandar Shah of Kelantan
6. Paduka Sri Sultan Mansur Shah of Kelantan
13. Princess of Majapahit
3. Mengindra Putri
7. a daughter of the Raja of Trengganu

== Bibliography ==
- Ahmad Sarji, Abdul Hamid (2011), The Encyclopedia of Malaysia, vol. 16 - The Rulers of Malaysia, Editions Didier Millet, ISBN 978-981-3018-54-9
- Buyong Adil (1972), Sejarah Pahang ('History of Pahang'), Dewan Bahasa dan Pustaka
- Khoo, Gilbert (1980), From Pre-Malaccan period to present day, New Straits Times
- Linehan, William (1973), History of Pahang, Malaysian Branch Of The Royal Asiatic Society, Kuala Lumpur, ISBN 978-0710-101-37-2
- Suria Fadhillah Md Fauzi; Zarith Sofiah Othman; Sharifah Shatrah Syed Hamid (2014), Undang-Undang Tubuh Kerajaan Pahang: Raja Pemerintah Sebagai Simbol Kuasa dan Kedaulatan Negeri, International Conference on Law, Policy and Social Justice, archived from the original on 2015-06-20
- Melayu Online, The Pahang Sultanate, archived from the original on 2014-11-09

Abdul Jamil Shah I of Pahang House of Malacca Died: 1512
Regnal titles
Preceded by Ahmad Shah I	Sultan of Pahang; 1495–1512	Succeeded by Mansur Shah I
