= Family tree of Singapura-Melakan monarchs =

The following is family tree of the Malay monarchs of Singapura-Melaka, from the establishment of Kingdom of Singapura in 1299 until the fall of Melaka Sultanate in 1511.

House of Singapura-Melaka

Singapura
Sri Tri Buana^{(1)} r. 1299-1347
Sri Wikrama Wira^{(2)} r. 1347-1362
Sri Rana Wikrama^{(3)} r. 1362-1375
Sri Maharaja^{(4)} r. 1375-1389
Melaka
Iskandar; Parameswara^{(5)} r. 1389-1398; Melaka^{(1)} r. 1400-1414
Megat Iskandar^{(2)} r. 1414-1424
Muhammad^{(3)} r. 1424-1444
Abu Syahid^{(4)} r. 1444-1446	Muzaffar^{(5)} r. 1446-1459
Mansur^{(6)} r. 1459-1477	♀Wanang Seri; Lela Wangsa; Old Pahang
House of Melaka-Pahang
Alauddin I^{(7)} r. 1477-1488	♀ Raja; Mahadewi	Ibrahim; Siak
Mahmud^{(8)} r. 1488-1511	House of Siak-Perak
Perak	Johor
Ahmad^{(9)} r. 1511-1513	Muzaffar I r. 1528-1549	Alauddin II r. 1528-1564
House of Melaka-Perak	House of Melaka-Johor
