= Cura Si Manjakini =

Sword mentioned in the Malay Annals

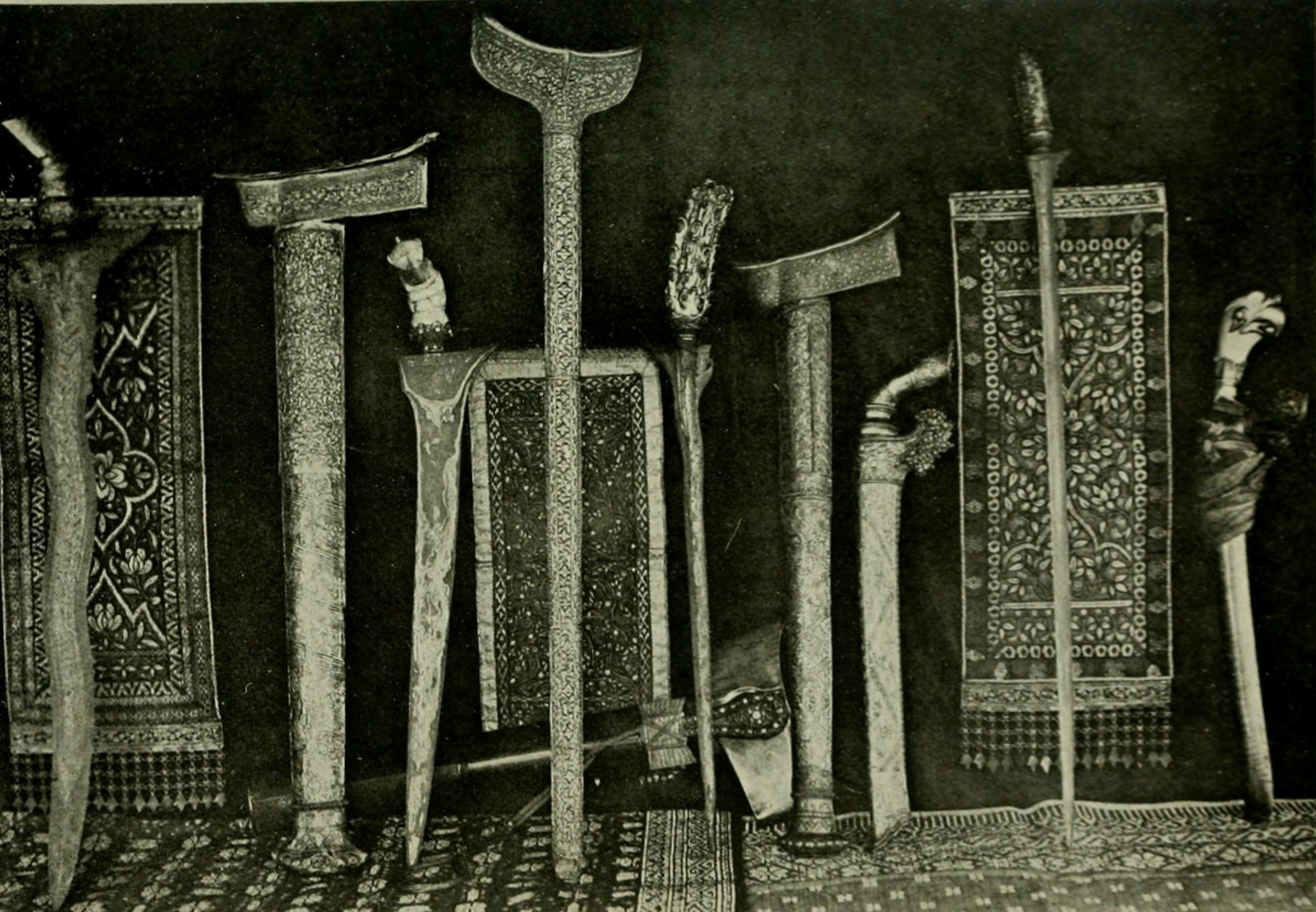
The Cura Si Manjakini sword as seen second from the right, among the rest of the Perak royal regalia, photographed in 1907.

Cura Si Manjakini (Malay: Pedang Cura Si Manjakini, alternatively Churika Mandakini or Mandangkini; Jawi: ڤدڠ چورا سي منجاکيني) is a sword mentioned in the Malay Annals as originally possessed by Sang Sapurba, the legendary ancestor of Malay kings. For hundreds of years, the sword became a symbol of a rightful sovereignty and power in Malay culture. It was first inherited by Sang Nila Utama the founder of Singapura, later by Parameswara the first ruler of Melaka Sultanate, and then by Muzaffar Syah I the first Sultan of Perak. The sword is now a part of the Perak Sultanate's official regalia.

== Etymology ==
The name of the sword has several transliterations depending on the root manuscript. The word cura is Sanskrit for knife or dagger while Mandakini (sometimes spelled Mandangkini or Manjakini) refers to the Mandakini River. Thus Cura Si Mandakini is generally accepted as meaning "blade of the Mandakini". Another theory interprets the name as coming from the Tamil-Sanskrit curik meaning to cleave, man deriving from mantra, and dakini referring to the mythological figures in Hindu-Buddhist belief.

== Legend ==
Tradition in the Malay Annals holds that the founder of the major line of rulers in the Malay world was a prince named Sang Sapurba, who alleged to be the descendant of Alexander the Great with his Persian wife. Sang Sapurba, then known as Sri Nila Pahlawan, first revealed himself with his younger brother Sri Nila Utama, upon the sacred hill of Seguntang in the hinterland of Palembang. The princes later descended into the great plain watered by the Palembang river, where Sang Sapurba married Wan Sendari, the daughter of the local chief, Demang Lebar Daun, and was everywhere accepted as ruler of the land. At a later date Sang Sapurba is said to have crossed the great central range of Sumatra into the Minangkabau Highlands, where one of his warriors, Permasku Mambang, slew the great serpent Saktimuna using the legendary sword, and was made the king of a grateful people and the founder of the long line of Princes of Minangkabau.

== Bibliography ==
- Ahmad, A. Samad (1979), Sulalatus Salatin (Sejarah Melayu), Dewan Bahasa dan Pustaka, ISBN 983-62-5601-6, archived from the original on 2013-10-12
- Hill, A.H (1956), The Malay Keris and Other Weapons, Malaysian Branch of the Royal Asiatic Society
- Leyden, John (1821), Malay Annals (translated from the Malay language), Longman, Hurst, Rees, Orme and Brown
- The Straits Times (1939), Sword of Alexander in State Regalia (2 March)
