= Mansur Shah I of Pahang =

Sultan of Pahang (1495–1519)

Mansur Shah I منصور شاه
- Sultan of Pahang
- Reign: 1495–1519
- Predecessor: Abdul Jamil Shah I
- Successor: Abdul Jamal Shah I
- Died: 1519
- Issue: Raja Ismail; Raja Puspa Dewi; Raja Kesuma Dewi
- House: Melaka
- Father: Abdul Jamil Shah I
- Religion: Sunni Islam

Sultan Mansur Shah ibni Almarhum Sultan Abdul Jamil Shah I (died 1519) was the fourth Sultan of Pahang from 1495 to 1519. He succeeded his father, Abdul Jamil Shah I upoin his abdication in 1495, He reigned jointly with his uncle, Sultan Abdul Jalil. He assumed full control after the death of the latter in 1512.

== Personal life ==
Sultan Mansur was known as Raja Mansur before his accession. He was the only son of the second sultan of Pahang, Abdul Jamil Shah I by his wife, a daughter of Bendahara Tun Hamzah of Pahang. He had a sister from his father's other wife named Raja Wad or Raja Olah.

From his marriage to an unknown woman, Sultan Mansur had a son, Raja Ismail and two daughters, Raja Puspa Dewi and Raja Kesuma Dewi. Raja Puspa Dewi was married to Raja Ahmad bin Raja Muhammad, a Terengganuan prince from House of Malacca. She had a son from this marriage, named Raja Umar, the future Ali Jalla Abdul Jalil Shah II of Johor.

In 1511, following the Portuguese Capture of Malacca, Sultan Mahmud retreated to Pahang where he stayed a year. During his stay, he arranged a marriage between Sultan Mansur and his daughter Raja Dewi, whose mother was a Kelantanese princess.

== Reign ==
Raja Mansur ascended to the throne at a very young age following the abdication of his father, Abdul Jamil Shah I, who went into religious seclusion in 1495. As Pahang at that time was a Malaccan vassal, Sultan Mahmud of Malacca had sent his minister Seri Dewa Raja to install his preferred new ruler. Raja Mansur was selected and was styled Mansur Shah I. It appears he reigned jointly with his uncle, Sultan Abdul Jalil. He had exercised authority over the young Sultan.

The reign of the two sultans oversaw the restoration of ties between Pahang and Malacca, that were previously marred by diplomatic tension during the reign of Abdul Jamil Shah. In 1500, the two states cooperated to defeat an invasion by the Nakhon Si Thammarat Kingdom on the instruction of Ramathibodi II of Ayutthaya. It was the last Siamese attempt, of this period, to subjugate the southern Malay states.

Following the death of his joint ruler and uncle, Sultan Abdul Jalil, Sultan Mansur became the sole ruler and assumed full control in 1512. Earlier in 1511, the city of Malacca was conquered by Portugal, bringing the rule of the Malacca Sultanate to an end, and as such ended Pahang's status as a vassal. However, the Portuguese still recognised Pahang as a vassal, on the pretext that the city is now under their control, and demanded tribute. Sultan Mansur refused to pay the annual tribute, which resulted in open warfare between Pahang and the Portuguese.

== Death ==
Around 1519 Sultan Mansur was killed by a group of hulubalang, for committing adultery with one of the former wives of his father. The story was narrated in the Bustanus al-Salatin. According to the Malay Annals, his killing was on the instruction of his father, the former Sultan Abdul Jamil, who was living in seclusion at Lubuk Pelang. Sultan Abdul Jamil also died shortly afterwards and was also buried at Lubuk Pelang. He was succeeded by his son Abdul Jamal Shah I.

== Bibliography ==
- Ahmad Sarji, Abdul Hamid (2011), The Encyclopedia of Malaysia, vol. 16 - The Rulers of Malaysia, Editions Didier Millet, ISBN 978-981-3018-54-9
- Buyong Adil (1972), Sejarah Pahang ('History of Pahang'), Dewan Bahasa dan Pustaka
- Khoo, Gilbert (1980), From Pre-Malaccan period to present day, New Straits Times
- Linehan, William (1973), History of Pahang, Malaysian Branch Of The Royal Asiatic Society, Kuala Lumpur, ISBN 978-0710-101-37-2
- Suria Fadhillah Md Fauzi; Zarith Sofiah Othman; Sharifah Shatrah Syed Hamid (2014), Undang-Undang Tubuh Kerajaan Pahang: Raja Pemerintah Sebagai Simbol Kuasa dan Kedaulatan Negeri, International Conference on Law, Policy and Social Justice, archived from the original on 2015-06-20
- Melayu Online, The Pahang Sultanate, archived from the original on 2014-11-09

Mansur Shah I of Pahang House of Malacca Died: 1519
Regnal titles
Preceded by Abdul Jamil Shah I	Sultan of Pahang; 1495–1519	Succeeded by Abdul Jamal Shah I
