= Ahmad Shah I of Pahang =

Ahmad Shah I آحمد شاه
- Sultan of Pahang
- Reign: 1475–1495
- Predecessor: Muhammad Shah
- Successor: Mansur Shah I Abdul Jalil
- Born: Malacca
- Died: 1519
- Issue: Raja Mansur; Raja Putri Olah
Regnal name
- Paduka Sri Sultan Ahmad Shah I ibni al-Marhum Sultan Mansur Shah
Posthumous name
- Marhum Syeikh
- House: Malacca
- Father: Mansur Shah
- Mother: Putri Wanang Sri Lela Wangsa
- Religion: Sunni Islam

Sultan Ahmad Shah I ibni Almarhum Sultan Mansur Shah (died 1519) was the second Sultan of Pahang from 1475 to 1495. He succeeded his younger brother, Muhammad Shah as sultan after the latter's death by poisoning in 1475. During his reign, relations between Pahang and its Malaccan overlord, deteriorated greatly, as a result of Sultan Ahmad's resentment towards his half-brother Sultan Alauddin Riayat Shah of Malacca. Under Sultan Ahmad's rule, Pahang became increasingly unstable with Sultan Ahmad abdicating around 1495, in favour of his son, Raja Mansur.

== Personal life ==
Sultan Ahmad was known as Raja Ahmad before his accession. He was the eldest of two sons of the sixth Sultan of Malacca, Mansur Shah by his wife Putri Wanang Sri Lela Wangsa, daughter of Dewa Sura, the last Pre-Malaccan ruler of Pahang, who was also a relative of the King of Ligor. Both his mother and grandfather were captured and presented to the Sultan of Malacca after the conquest of Pahang in 1454.

In 1470, his younger brother Raja Muhammad was banished from Malacca for committing murder, and was installed as the Sultan of Pahang. Soon afterwards, Raja Ahmad also left Malacca for Pahang after being installed as heir to the Pahangese throne by his father. It is speculated that this appointment was consolation after he had been passed over from the succession of the Malaccan throne as his younger half-brother, Raja Husain was installed as the heir instead. This event led to Raja Ahmad resenting his half-brother, leading to cold relations between both states during his reign.

Sultan Ahmad married a daughter of Bendahara Tun Hamzah, and by her, had a son, Raja Mansur.

== Reign ==
The Bustanus Salatin records that Raja Ahmad succeeded his younger brother Muhammad as Sultan of Pahang, who, according to the Portuguese records, died of poisoning in 1475. Two years later in 1477, following the death of their father Mansur Shah, his half-brother, Raja Husain ascended the Malaccan throne and took the title Alauddin Riayat Shah. Relations between Malacca and Pahang deteriorated shortly after his accession.

The Malay Annals narrates the event when Sultan Ahmad became furious after learning that, the head of the neighboring Terengganu chieftaincy, Tun Telanai, had recognised the overlordship of Malacca and paid his obeisance to Sultan Alauddin, without his knowledge. On the return of Tun Telanai to Terengganu, he was murdered by the head of Pahang Hulubalang, Seri Akar Raja, who later established his control over the chieftaincy. The family of Tun Telanai complained about the matter to Sultan Alauddin, who later viewed the murder as an insult aimed directly at him. He initially wanted to go to war with Pahang but was later calmed by his ministers. Alauddin later exacted revenge when a Malaccan mission to Pahang, attacked and killed a cousin of Seri Akar Raja.

Sultan Alauddin died in 1488 died at Pagoh on the Muar River. Rumours spread that he was assassinated by poisoning, and among those implicated was Sultan Ahmad. The other potential perpetrators included the chief of Inderagiri, Raja Merlang, who lived in Malacca and had married Raja Bakal, the half-sister of Sultan Alauddin. Sultan Alauddin was succeeded by his son Mahmud Shah who – because of the rumours surrounding the death of his father – had developed a strong animosity towards his uncle in Pahang. He would later become directly involved in a conflict with Sultan Ahmad, when he ordered the abduction of a beautiful Pahang noblewoman, Tun Teja, who was betrothed to the Pahang ruler. Tun Teja was eventually won over and brought to Malacca to marry Sultan Mahmud.

== Abdication ==
Sultan Ahmad was bitter over the slights and insults from Malacca and particularly took offense to Mahmud Shah's abduction of Tun Teja. Unable to get reveange and shamed before his subjects, he abdicated in favour of his very young son, Raja Mansur. The new ruler was placed under the guardianship of his cousins, the three sons of Muhammad Shah. In describing Ahmad Shah's life after the abdication, the Malay Annals noted: "his highness went upstream for so long as the royal drums could be heard; when he came to Lubuk Pelang (in present-day Jerantut constituency) there he resided, and the sound of the drums was no longer heard. He went into religious seclusion; he it is whom people call Marhum Syeikh."

These events took place around 1495. Accounts in the Malay Annals relates it to the reign of Sultan Abdul Jamil instead of Sultan Ahmad, but scholars are in agreement that it was Sultan Ahmad who actually went into religious seclusion, and died at Lubuk Pelang where his possible unnamed tomb is located. Sultan Abdul Jamil (also pronounced 'Abdul Jalil'), on the other hand, is believed to have reigned and died at Pekan, instead of Lubuk Pelang, based on the discovery of a tombstone with his name at Makam Ziarat Raja Raden, Pekan.

Centuries later in 1862, the shrine of Marhum Syeikh at Lubuk Pelang became the location where Wan Ahmad, the future Sultan Ahmad of modern Pahang, took his vows before routing the remaining forces of Tun Mutahir in the Pahang Civil War.

== Bibliography ==
- Ahmad Sarji, Abdul Hamid (2011), The Encyclopedia of Malaysia, vol. 16 - The Rulers of Malaysia, Editions Didier Millet, ISBN 978-981-3018-54-9
- Khoo, Gilbert (1980), From Pre-Malaccan period to present day, New Straits Times
- Linehan, William (1973), History of Pahang, Malaysian Branch Of The Royal Asiatic Society, Kuala Lumpur, ISBN 978-0710-101-37-2
- Suria Fadhillah Md Fauzi; Zarith Sofiah Othman; Sharifah Shatrah Syed Hamid (2014), Undang-Undang Tubuh Kerajaan Pahang: Raja Pemerintah Sebagai Simbol Kuasa dan Kedaulatan Negeri, International Conference on Law, Policy and Social Justice, archived from the original on 2015-06-20
- Melayu Online, The Pahang Sultanate, archived from the original on 2014-11-09

Ahmad Shah I of Pahang House of Malacca Died: 1512
Regnal titles
Preceded by Muhammad Shah	Sultan of Pahang; 1475–1495	Succeeded by Mansur Shah I
