= Raja Bajau =

Raja Bajau راج باجاو
- Yamtuan Muda of Pahang
- Reign: 1641–1676
- Predecessor: Position Established
- Successor: None
- Issue: Raja Ibrahim
- House: Melaka
- Father: Abdullah Ma'ayat Shah
- Mother: Raja Putri Kamarliah of Pahang
- Religion: Sunni Islam

Raja Bajau ibni Almarhum Sultan 'Abdu'llah Mu'ayat Shah (died 1676) was a prince from House of Melaka who ruled Pahang as the dominion of Johor Empire from 1641 to 1676. He was the son of the 6th Sultan of Johor, Abdullah Ma'ayat Shah by his wife, Raja Putri Kamarliah, daughter of the 11th Sultan of Pahang, Ahmad Shah II. He was appointed as heir apparent during the reign of his first cousin, Abdul Jalil Shah III and took the title of Yamtuan Muda and ruler of Pahang.

Following the sack of Johor capital in Batu Sawar by Jambi forces in 1673, Abdul Jalil Shah III fled to Pahang and established his administration centre in Kuala Pahang before he died in 1676. The year before, Raja Bajau had died and leaving behind a son, Raja Ibrahim who later succeeded as the next Sultan of Johor-Pahang in 1676.
