= Dewa Sura =

Last pre-Malaccan ruler of Pahang

- Maharaja of Pahang

Last Maharaja of Pahang
- Reign: c. 1310–1450
- Predecessor: ?
- Successor: Raja Muhammad as Sultan of Pahang
- Issue: Wanang Seri Lela Wangsa
- House: Inderapura
- Religion: Buddhist

Dewa Sura also known as Sura was a ruler of the Old Pahang kingdom who reigned in the middle of the 15th century. His name was described in the Malay Annals as the last Maharaja of Pahang, whose kingdom was conquered by Malacca Sultanate.

Muzaffar Shah, the fifth Sultan of Malacca who reigned from 1445 to 1458 refused to acknowledge the suzerainty of Ligor over his country. The Ligorians, in assertion of their claim, sent an invading army led by Awi Chakri, overland to Malacca. The invaders, who were aided by Pahang auxiliaries, followed the old route by the Tembeling, Pahang and Bera rivers. They were easily defeated and fled back by the same route. Subsequently, they attempted a naval invasion, but were again beaten. Muzaffar Shah then conceived the idea of checking Ligorian pretensions by attacking the Ligor vassal state of Pahang. An expedition was organised by Muzaffar's son, Raja Abdullah (Mansur Shah) and was personally led by the Malaccan Bendahara Tun Perak with two hundred sail, big and small, accordingly proceeded to Pahang and conquered it in the year 1454. Dewa Sura fled to the interior while his daughter Putri Wanang Seri was captured. The victors, anxious to gain the goodwill of the Bendahara, hastened in pursuit of the fugitive king until he was captured and carried together with his daughter to Malacca.

In 1454, the year that Pahang was conquered, Raja Abdullah married Putri Wanang Seri, the daughter of Dewa Sura, whose name had been changed, probably on conversion to Islam, to Putri Lela Wangsa. By her he had two sons Raja Ahmad and Raja Muhammad, who would later be proclaimed as Sultans of Pahang.

== Bibliography ==
- Linehan, William (1973), History of Pahang, Malaysian Branch Of The Royal Asiatic Society, Kuala Lumpur, ISBN 978-0710-101-37-2
