= Zainal Abidin Shah of Pahang =

Zainal Abidin Shah زين العابدين شاه
- Sultan of Pahang
- Reign: 1540–1555
- Predecessor: Muzaffar Shah
- Successor: Mansur Shah II
- Died: 1555
- Spouse: Raja Putri Dewi; Tun Kamala
- Issue: Raja Mansur; Raja Jamal; Raja Kadir; Raja Putri Khalija; Raja Putri Bongsu
Regnal name
- Paduka Sri Sultan Zainal Abidin Shah ibni al-Marhum Sultan Mahmud Shah
Posthumous name
- Marhum di Bukit
- House: Malacca
- Father: Mahmud Shah
- Mother: Raja Putri Olah binti al-Marhum Sultan Ahmad
- Religion: Sunni Islam

Sultan Zainal Abidin Shah ibni Almarhum Sultan Mahmud Shah (died 1555) was the seventh Sultan of Pahang and reigned from 1540 to 1555. He succeeded his elder brother Sultan Muzaffar Shah on his death in 1540.

== Personal life ==
Known as Raja Zainal before his accession, Zainal Abidin Shah was the younger son of the fifth Sultan of Pahang, Mahmud Shah by his first wife, Raja Putri Olah binti al-Marhum Sultan Ahmad. He was married first to his second cousin, Raja Putri Dewi, daughter of Sultan Mahmud Shah of Malacca by a Kelantanese princess, Putri Onang Kening. He had four children from this marriage, two sons, Raja Mansur, and Raja Jamal, and two daughters, Puteri Khalijah and Puteri Bongsu. Zainal Abidin's second wife was a non-royal, Tun Gemala, daughter of his Bendahara, Seri Buana. By her, he had a son Raja Abdul Kadir. In addition he had eighteen children by his junior wives and concubines. Puteri Khalijah married her first cousin Raja Mahmud, son of Alauddin Riayat Shah II of Johor. Raja Mahmud settled in Pahang and died there.

== Reign ==
The reign of Sultan Zainal Abidin saw the renewed attempts by the rump state of the Malacca Sultanate based in Johor to retake the city of Malacca, under the leadership of Alauddin Riayat Shah II of Johor. In 1547, the combined forces from Johor, Pahang and Perak, consisting of three hundred sailed ships and eight thousand men were assembled in the Muar River. The objective of these forces was unknown but Portuguese Malacca was informed that the fleet was there in preparation to attack the Aceh Sultanate. The Portuguese grew to suspect that the forces' real intention was to attack Malacca. Later, a Portuguese plan to assemble a large fleet to intercept the Malay forces was leaked, prompting the dispersal of the Malay forces in the Muar River. A few years later in 1550, another attempt to take Malacca was made by the combined forces of Johor, Pahang and Perak. Rumours spread that the Portuguese warships were harassing the harbours of Pahang leading to the Pahangese fleet retreating to defend their capital. In the face of superior Portuguese arms and vessels, the combined Malay forces were forced to retreat.

== Death ==
Sultan Zainal Abidin died around 1555 and was posthumously styled Marhum di Bukit ('the late ruler who was buried on the hill'). It may be that he was buried in Makam Nibong, on top of a hill in Pekan Lama, the ancient name for which was Makam Tembuni ('the graveyard of the cauls'). He was succeeded by his eldest son, Raja Mansur.

== Bibliography ==
- Ahmad Sarji, Abdul Hamid (2011), The Encyclopedia of Malaysia, vol. 16 - The Rulers of Malaysia, Editions Didier Millet, ISBN 978-981-3018-54-9
- Buyong Adil (1972), Sejarah Pahang ('History of Pahang'), Dewan Bahasa dan Pustaka
- Khoo, Gilbert (1980), From Pre-Malaccan period to present day, New Straits Times
- Linehan, William (1973), History of Pahang, Malaysian Branch Of The Royal Asiatic Society, Kuala Lumpur, ISBN 978-0710-101-37-2
- Suria Fadhillah Md Fauzi; Zarith Sofiah Othman; Sharifah Shatrah Syed Hamid (2014), Undang-Undang Tubuh Kerajaan Pahang: Raja Pemerintah Sebagai Simbol Kuasa dan Kedaulatan Negeri, International Conference on Law, Policy and Social Justice
- Melayu Online, The Pahang Sultanate

Zainal Abidin Shah of Pahang House of Malacca Died: 1555
Regnal titles
Preceded by Muzaffar Shah	Sultan of Pahang; 1540–1555	Succeeded by Mansur Shah II
