= Abdul Kadir Alauddin Shah of Pahang =

Abdul Kadir Alauddin Shah عبد القدير علاء الدين شاه
- Sultan of Pahang
- Reign: 1560–1590
- Predecessor: Abdul Jamal Shah
- Successor: Ahmad Shah II
- Died: 1590
- Issue: Raja Abdul Ghafur; Raja Yamir; Raja Ahmad; Raja Putri Kamarliah; Raja Putri Khairul Bariah
- House: Malacca
- Father: Zainal Abidin Shah
- Mother: Tun Kamala
- Religion: Sunni Islam

Sultan Abdul Kadir Alauddin Shah ibni Almarhum Sultan Zainal Abidin Shah (died 1590) was the tenth Sultan of Pahang reigning from 1560 to 1590. Known as Raja Kadir before his accession, he was the youngest son of the seventh Sultan of Pahang, Zainal Abidin Shah by his second wife, Tun Kamala, daughter of the Bendahara Sri Buwana. Abdul Kadir Alauddin Shah was adopted by his half-brother Mansur Shah II, and succeeded him on his death in 1560 as a joint ruler alongside Sultan Abdul Jamal Shah. He was succeeded by his only son by royal wife, Raja Ahmad.

== Bibliography ==
Abdul Kadir Alauddin Shah of Pahang House of Malacca Died: 1590
Regnal titles
Preceded by Abdul Jamal Shah	Sultan of Pahang; 1560–1590	Succeeded by Ahmad Shah II
