= Sultan of Pahang =

Hereditary constitutional head of Pahang, Malaysia

- Sultan Pahang سلطان ڤهڠ
- State
- Arms of His Royal Highness the Sultan of Pahang

Incumbent
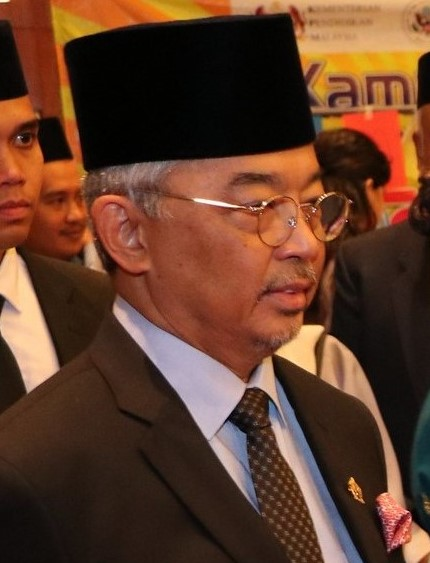
- Abdullah in October 2019
- Al-Sultan Abdullah Ri'ayatuddin; Al-Mustafa Billah Shah, Sultan of Pahang since 11 January 2019

Details
- Style: His Royal Highness
- Heir apparent: Tengku Hassanal Ibrahim Alam Shah
- First monarch: Ahmad Muʽazzam
- Formed: 1470; 556 years ago (original); 1882; 144 years ago (modern)
- Residences: Istana Abu Bakar, Pekan
- Website: www.dirajapahang.my

Sultan of Pahang (Malay: Sultan Pahang, Jawi: سلطان ڤهڠ) is the title of the hereditary constitutional head of Pahang, Malaysia. The current sultan is Al-Sultan Abdullah ibni Sultan Ahmad Shah. He is the Head of Islam in the state and the source of all titles, honours and dignities in the state. Historically, the title was also used by rulers of the Pahang Sultanate.

== History ==
The Old Pahang Kingdom appeared in foreign records from as early as 5th century and at its height, covered much of the modern state of Pahang and the entire southerly part of the peninsula. Throughout its pre-Melakan history, Pahang was established as a mueang or naksat of some major regional Malayic mandalas including Langkasuka, Srivijaya and Ligor. Around the middle of the 15th century, it was brought into the orbit of Melaka Sultanate and subsequently established as a vassal Muslim Sultanate in 1470, following the coronation of the grandson of the former Maharaja as the first Sultan of Pahang.

Over the years, Pahang grew independent from Melakan control and at one point even established itself as a rival state to Melaka until the latter's demise in 1511. At the height of its influence, the Sultanate was an important power in Southeast Asian history and controlled the entire Pahang basin, bordering to the north, the Pattani Sultanate, and adjoins to that of Johor Sultanate to the south. To the west, it also extends jurisdiction over part of modern-day Selangor and Negeri Sembilan. During this period, Pahang was heavily involved in attempts to rid the Peninsula of the various foreign imperial powers; Portugal, Holland and Aceh. After a period of Acehnese raids in the early 17th century, Pahang entered into the amalgamation with the successor of Melaka, Johor, when its 14th sultan, Abdul Jalil Shah III, was also crowned the 7th sultan of Johor. After a period of union with Johor, it was eventually revived as a modern sovereign Sultanate in the late 19th century by the Bendahara dynasty.

After a period of union with Johor, the autonomous Pahang Kingdom came into existence with the consolidation of power by the Bendahara family, following the gradual dismemberment of Johor Empire. A self rule was established in Pahang in the late 18th century, with Tun Abdul Majid declared as the first Raja Bendahara of Pahang. The area around Pahang formed a part of the hereditary domains attached to this title and administered directly by the Raja Bendahara. The weakening of the Johor sultanate and the disputed succession to the throne was matched by an increasing independence of the great territorial magnates; the Bendahara in Pahang, the Temenggong in Johor and Singapore, and the Yamtuan Muda in Riau.

In 1853, the fourth Raja Bendahara Tun Ali, renounced his allegiance to the Sultan of Johor and became independent ruler of Pahang. He was able to maintain peace and stability during his reign, but his death in 1857 precipitated civil war between his sons. The younger son Wan Ahmad challenged the succession of his half-brother Tun Mutahir, in a dispute that escalated into a civil war. Supported by the neighbouring Terengganu Sultanate and the Siamese, Wan Ahmad emerged victorious, establishing controls over important towns and expelled his brother in 1863. He served as the last Raja Bendahara, and was proclaimed Sultan of Pahang by his chiefs in 1881.

== List of rulers ==
=== House of Melaka ===
==== Sultan of Pahang ====
1. 1470–1475: Muhammad Shah
2. 1475–1495: Abdul Jamil Shah I
3. 1495–1512: Abdul Jalil reign jointly with Mansur Shah
4. 1495–1519: Mansur Shah I reign jointly with Abdul Jalil
5. 1519: Abdul Jamal Shah I
6. 1519–1530: Mahmud Shah I
7. 1530–1540: Muzaffar Shah
8. 1540–1555: Zainal Abidin Shah
9. 1555–1560: Mansur Shah II
10. 1560–1575: Abdul Jamal Shah II reign jointly with Abdul Kadir Alauddin Shah
11. 1560–1590: Abdul Kadir Alauddin Shah reign jointly with Abdul Jamal Shah
12. 1590–1592: Ahmad Shah
13. 1592–1614: Abdul Ghafur Muhiuddin Shah
14. 1614–1615: Alauddin Riayat Shah
15. 1615–1617: Abdul Jalil Shah III first time
16. 1617–1623: Interregnum

==== Sultan of Johor-Pahang-Riau-Lingga (Johor Empire) ====
From 1623, Pahang was nominally merged with Johor when Johor's Sultan Abdullah Ma'ayat Shah died and Raja Bujang emerged as the new ruler of Johor-Pahang. Installed as Abdul Jalil Riayat Shah III, he reigned until 1677. With the decline of Aceh, Johor-Pahang gradually extend its suzerainty over the Riau-Lingga islands.

1. 1623–1677: Abdul Jalil Shah III
  - 1641–1676: Yamtuan Muda Raja Bajau – heir apparent to the Johor throne who ruled Pahang as separate dominion until his death in 1676.
2. 1677–1685: Ibrahim Shah
3. 1685–1699: Mahmud Shah II

=== House of Bendahara ===
==== Sultan of Johor-Pahang-Riau-Lingga (Johor Empire) ====
When Mahmud Shah II died in 1699, Bendahara Tun Abdul Jalil became Sultan of Johor-Pahang-Riau-Lingga and assumed the title Sultan Abdul Jalil Shah IV. His appointment was accepted by Johor chiefs based on an understanding that the Bendahara would succeed to the throne if the Sultan died without heirs.

1. 1699–1720: Abdul Jalil Shah IV (Bendahara Tun Abdul Jalil)
2. 1722–1760: Sulaiman Badrul Alam Shah
3. 1760–1761: Abdul Jalil Muazzam Shah
4. 1761–1761: Ahmad Riayat Shah
5. 1761–1770: Mahmud Shah III

==== Raja Bendahara of Pahang ====
By the early 19th century, the Johor-Pahang-Riau-Lingga empire had begun to break up. After 1806, the empire's constituent parts effectively became principalities, and the cultural unity that had hitherto existed between the Malay Peninsula and the islands of Riau-Lingga was gradually destroyed. The signing of Anglo-Dutch Treaty in 1824 further undermined the cohesion of the Johor-Pahang-Riau-Lingga empire and contributed to the emergence of Pahang and Johor as independent states. The Treaty confirmed, among other things, that the islands south of Singapore, including Java and Sumatra, were to remain the preserve of the Dutch, while the Peninsula would be within the British sphere of influence. The Malay Rulers were not consulted about the Treaty, and the Johor-Pahang-Riau-Lingga empire became irrevocably divided when a succession dispute gave rise to two centres of power, one in Riau-Lingga (under Abdul Rahman Muazzam Shah, r. 1812–1832) and the other in Johor (under Hussein Shah, r.1819–1835).

From here, the Raja Bendahara grew increasingly independent. While Bendahara Tun Ali had acknowledged Abdul Rahman as his overlord, the Anglo-Dutch Treaty confined the Sultan to Riau-Lingga, where he was deemed a vassal of the Dutch, and prevented him from exercising his control over the Malay Peninsula, which had come under the British. Bendahara Tun Ali declared his autonomy from the empire by 1853. He was able to maintain peace and stability during his reign, but his death in 1858 precipitated civil war among his sons, Tun Mutahir and Tun Ahmad, the result of which the formation of modern Pahang Sultanate.

1. 1770–1802: Tun Abdul Majid
2. 1802–1803: Tun Muhammad
3. 1803–1806: Tun Koris
4. 1806–1858: Tun Ali
5. 1858–1863: Tun Mutahir
6. 1863–1881: Tun Ahmad later proclaimed as Sultan

==== Sultan of Modern Pahang ====
1. 1881–1914: Ahmad al-Mu’azzam Shah
2. 1914–1917: Mahmud Shah
3. 1917–1932: Abdullah al-Mu’tassim Billah Shah
4. 1932–1974: Abu Bakar Ri’ayatuddin al-Mu’azzam Shah
5. 1974–2019: Ahmad Shah Al-Musta’in Billah. Sultan Ahmad abdicated in ill health after Muhammad V of Kelantan abdicated as King of Malaysia on 6 January 2019, allowing his son to become Sultan of Pahang and thus King of Malaysia.
6. 2019–present: Abdullah Ri’ayatuddin Al-Mustafa Billah Shah. Sultan Abdullah became King of Malaysia on 31 January 2019, shortly after he replaced his father as Sultan of Pahang on 11 January.

== See also ==
- Pahang
- Family tree of Malaysian monarchs

== Bibliography ==
- Ahmad Sarji Abdul Hamid (2011), The Encyclopedia of Malaysia, vol. 16 – The Rulers of Malaysia, Editions Didier Millet, ISBN 978-981-3018-54-9
- Farish A Noor (2011), From Inderapura to Darul Makmur, A Deconstructive History of Pahang, Silverfish Books, ISBN 978-983-3221-30-1
- Guy, John (2014), Lost Kingdoms: Hindu-Buddhist Sculpture of Early Southeast Asia, Metropolitan Museum of Art, ISBN 978-0300-204-37-7
- Khoo, Gilbert (1980), "From Pre-Malaccan period to present day", New Straits Times
- Linehan, William (1973), History of Pahang, Malaysian Branch of the Royal Asiatic Society, Kuala Lumpur, ISBN 978-0710-101-37-2
- Rajani, Chand Chirayu (1987), Towards a history of Laem Thong and Sri Vijaya (Asian studies monographs), Institute of Asian Studies, Chulalongkorn University, ISBN 978-9745-675-01-8
