= Alauddin Riayat Shah of Pahang =

Alauddin Riayat Shah علاء الدين رعاية شاه
- Sultan of Pahang
- Reign: 1614–1615
- Predecessor: Abdul Ghafur Muhiuddin Shah
- Successor: Abdul Jalil Shah III
- House: Malacca
- Father: Abdul Ghafur Muhiuddin Shah
- Religion: Sunni Islam

Sultan Alauddin Riayat Shah ibni Almarhum Sultan Abdul Ghafur Muhiuddin Shah was the 13th Sultan of Pahang reigning from 1614 to 1615. He seized the throne after killing his father, Abdul Ghafur Muhiuddin Shah and elder brother, the heir apparent Raja Abdullah. His name was identified with the discovery of a treaty attached with his seal in the Portuguese National Archives in Lisbon.

== Life and reign ==
Alauddin was said to be the second son of Sultan Abdul Ghafur. Account on his name in local history is relatively unknown as it was never disclosed. Dong-Xiyang kao ('A study of the Eastern and Western Oceans'), a 1618 Chinese account written during the Ming dynasty recorded that he had killed his father and elder brother Raja Abdullah, and took the throne for himself. The Chinese account further describes his short reign with the increase in pirate activities sanctioned by the Sultan himself with the association of Brunei. Alauddin is also said to have improved the port facility to facilitate trade, when he erected a number of shops and merchant quarters.

In a treaty dated 16 August 1614, Sultan Alauddin, known as El Rey De Pao ('King of Pahang') entered into an agreement with Diogo de Mendonça Furtado, Capitão-mor of the Southern Seas, on behalf of the King of Portugal. It is from this document, that his name is known today, based on the seal on the document that bears his name.

== Seal ==
The seal of Sultan Alauddin is written in Arabic with the centre engraved in relief and border in intaglio. Some of the words are unclear and indecipherable:

Original Jawi text

..السلطان علاء الدين رعايتساه ابن عبد الغفار شاه // الواثق بال..القيام با..خلد الله ملكه وسلطانه

Transliteration

al Sultan Alauddin Riayat Shah ibn Abdul Ghafar Shah // al-wathiq bi-al..al-qaim bi..khallada Allah mulkahu wa-sultanahu

Translation

The Sultan Alauddin Riayat Shah son of Abdul Ghafar Shah // he who trusts in the..he who is steadfast..may god preserve his realm and dominion

The seal is regarded as the earliest known Islamic seal from the Malay Peninsula.

== Union with Johor ==
In 1615, in confirmation on their treaty with Johor at Malacca in August 1615, the Portuguese escorted Raja Bujang, a relative from Johor's ruling house, to Pahang to take possession of the state. This Johor-Portuguese treaty angered Iskandar Muda, Sultan of Aceh, who after having sacked Johor's capital Batu Sawar in September 1615, and sent Sultan Abdullah into exile, devastated Pahang in 1617.

This development however seem to differ from the Chinese accounts which recorded that Sultan Alauddin was still ruling Pahang until 1618. However, at this time, Pahang was said to have become a piratical state where revolts and disorder were common.

Pahang was nominally merged with Johor in 1623 when Johor's Sultan Abdullah died and was succeeded by his nephew Raja Bujang who later emerged as the new ruler of Johor as Sultan Abdul Jalil Shah III. In 1638, Abdul Jalil, in an attempt to reassert his claim, invaded Pahang and established his rule in the state. The event marked the complete union of Johor and Pahang, and the establishment of the Johor Empire.

== Bibliography ==
- Ahmad Sarji Abdul Hamid (2011), The Encyclopedia of Malaysia, vol. 16 – The Rulers of Malaysia, Editions Didier Millet, ISBN 978-981-3018-54-9
- Gallop, Annabel Teh; Porter, Venetia; Barakat, Heba Nayel (2012). Lasting Impressions: Seals from the Islamic World. Kuala Lumpur: Islamic Arts Museum Malaysia. ISBN 978-9834469696.
- Linehan, William (1973), History of Pahang, Malaysian Branch Of The Royal Asiatic Society, Kuala Lumpur, ISBN 978-0710-101-37-2

Alauddin Riayat Shah of Pahang House of Malacca
Regnal titles
| Preceded by Abdul Ghafur Muhiuddin Shah | Sultan of Pahang; 1614–1615 | Succeeded by Abdul Jalil Shah III |
