= Ibrahim Shah of Johor =

Sultan of the Johor Sultanate

Ibrahim Shah إبراهيم شاه
- Sultan of Johor
- Reign: 1677–1685
- Predecessor: Abdul Jalil Shah III
- Successor: Mahmud Shah II
- Died: February 16, 1685; Riau
- House: Malacca
- Father: Raja Bajau
- Religion: Sunni Islam

Paduka Sri Sultan Ibrahim Shah Zilu'llah fil'Alam Khalifat ul-Muminin ibni al-Marhum Yam Tuan Muda Raja Bajau was the Sultan of Johor from the Malacca-Johor Dynasty who reigned from 1677 to 1685. He was the only known son of the Yamtuan Muda of Pahang, Raja Bajau and became Sultan of Johor-Pahang-Riau-Lingga following the death of his cousin Sultan Abdul Jalil Shah III of Johor.

In 1678, Laksamana Tun Abdul Jamil persuaded Ibrahim Shah to move the capital of the empire to Riau in order to effectively suppress Jambi's forces, who years prior sacked the old capital of Batu Sawar. Jambi was finally subdued in 1679. In 1681, Johor's forces assisted Jambi, now its vassal, in defeating Palembang and its Bugis allies.

Although Ibrahim Shah wanted to return to Johor Lama towards the end of his reign, he was persuaded against this by the family of Laksamana Tun Abdul Jamil, who grew very powerful in the mainland while the Sultan was away in Riau.

Ibrahim Shah died at Riau on 16 February 1685, poisoned by three of his wives, having had one son by his third wife, who succeeded him as Mahmud Shah II.

== Bibliography ==
- Ahmad Sarji Abdul Hamid (2011), The Encyclopedia of Malaysia, vol. 16 - The Rulers of Malaysia, Editions Didier Millet, ISBN 978-981-3018-54-9

Ibrahim Shah of Johor Malacca-Johor dynasty Died: 1685
Regnal titles
Preceded by Abdul Jalil Shah III	Sultan of Johor; 1677–1685	Succeeded by Mahmud Shah II
