= Abdul Jamal Shah of Pahang =

Abdul Jamal Shah عبد الجامل شاه
- Sultan of Pahang
- Reign: 1560–1575
- Predecessor: Mansur Shah II
- Successor: Abdul Kadir Alauddin Shah
- Died: 1575
- Issue: Raja Putri Siti
- House: Malacca
- Father: Zainal Abidin Shah
- Mother: Raja Putri Dewi
- Religion: Sunni Islam

Sultan Abdul Jamal Shah ibni Almarhum Sultan Zainal Abidin Shah (died 1575) was the ninth Sultan of Pahang reigning from 1560 to 1575. Known as Raja Jamal before his accession, he was the second son of the seventh Sultan of Pahang, Zainal Abidin Shah by his wife, Raja Putri Dewi, daughter of the last Sultan of Malacca, Mahmud Shah. He reigned jointly with his younger brother, Raja Kadir.

== Bibliography ==
Abdul Jamal Shah of Pahang House of Malacca Died: 1575
Regnal titles
Preceded by Mansur Shah II	Sultan of Pahang; 1560–1575	Succeeded by Abdul Kadir Alauddin Shah
