= Ahmad Shah II of Pahang =

Ahmad Shah II آحمد شاه
- Sultan of Pahang
- Reign: 1590–1592
- Predecessor: Abdul Kadir Alauddin Shah
- Successor: Abdul Ghafur Muhiuddin Shah
- Died: 1617
- Spouse: A daughter of Muhammad Hassan of Brunei; Putri Bongsu Chandra Dewi
- Issue: Iskandar Thani; Raja Putri Kamarliah
- House: Malacca
- Father: Abdul Kadir Alauddin Shah
- Religion: Sunni Islam

Sultan Ahmad Shah II ibni Almarhum Sultan Abdul Kadir Alauddin Shah (died 1617) was the 11th Sultan of Pahang reigning from 1590 to 1592. Known as Raja Ahmad before his accession, he was the only son of the tenth Sultan of Pahang, Abdul Kadir Alauddin Shah, by a royal wife. He succeeded his father on his death in 1590 and reigned under the regency of his elder half-brother, Raja Abdul Ghafur.

In the interregnum period following the death of Sultan Abdul Ghafur Muhiuddin Shah in 1614, Pahang descended into chaos and was conquered by the Aceh Sultanate under Sultan Iskandar Muda in 1617. The former Sultan Ahmad Shah II and his family was taken as hostages to Aceh, where he died after 1617. Ahmad Shah's eldest son, Raja Mughal later known as Iskandar Thani was married to Iskandar Muda's daughter, the later Queen Taj ul-Alam and eventually succeeded him as the 13th Sultan of Aceh in 1636.

Ahmad Shah II of Pahang House of Malacca Died: 1617
Regnal titles
Preceded by Abdul Kadir Alauddin Shah	Sultan of Pahang; 1590–1592	Succeeded by Abdul Ghafur Muhiuddin Shah
