= Buyong Adil =

- Born: Mohd Yusuf bin Adil; 27 January 1907; Teluk Intan, Perak, Federated Malay States
- Died: 31 August 1976 (aged 69); Malaysia
- Other names: Cikgu Buyong
- Occupations: Historian, writer, educator
- Employer(s): Dewan Bahasa dan Pustaka, Public Services Commission of Singapore
- Known for: Authoring Malaysian state histories
- Notable work: Sejarah Johor, Sejarah Perak, Sejarah Pahang and others
- Spouse: Halimah binti Mohd Daim
- Children: 2 sons, 3 daughters

Buyong Adil (born Mohd Yusuf bin Adil; 27 January 1907 – 31 August 1976) was a national historian of Malaysia and author of several books on the history of Malaysia. Buyong was a nickname given by his parents. He was also known as Cikgu Buyong. He would spend his later career working in the Dewan Bahasa dan Pustaka, a government regulating body that coordinates the use of the Malay language and Malay-language literature.

== Biography ==
=== Education and career ===
Buyong Adil was born on 27 January 1907 in Teluk Intan, Perak. He received his early education at Sekolah Melayu Teluk Anson and later entered the Kolej Latihan Sultan Idris (SITC), Tanjung Malim in 1924. He was the best student at SITC and became a lecturer there after graduating. He began to write on history after his teacher, Abdul Hadi Hassan, moved to Kelantan. In 1939, Buyong Adil wrote Sejarah Alam Melayu Penggal IV and Sejarah Melayu V.

During the Japanese occupation, he was selected to undergo Japanese teacher training at the Tokyo Shihan Gakko located in Kajang, Selangor.

After the occupation ended, he was appointed as headmaster in a school in Ipoh. During this time, he started being actively involved in the Perak Malay Coalition (Perikatan Melayu Perak). This led to the British appointing him as the head for the radio station for all the Malay schools in Singapore (which was at that time still a part of Malaysia). He also directed his first play after the Japanese occupation. Megat Terawis was staged mainly for the teachers and their family members. Later, he became historical advisor for P Ramlee's first movie to be shown in colour, Hang Tuah.

After retiring from the government in 1962, he was chosen as a member of Singapore's Public Services Commission (Perkhidmatan Awam Singapura) from 1963 until 1969. During that time, he managed to write Sejarah Johor, Sejarah Selangor, Sejarah Perak and Sejarah Pahang. He also assisted Sri Senu Abdul Rahman in collecting materials for the book Revolusi Mental in 1970.

In 1971, he started work at Dewan Bahasa dan Pustaka (DBP) as a research officer on history. This was when he began to write his other books, Sejarah Sarawak, Sejarah Perlis, Sejarah Negeri Sembilan, Sejarah Melaka, Sejarah Kedah, Sejarah Terengganu and Sejarah Kelantan which were published by the DBP.

=== Personal life ===
Buyong Adil married at the age of 22. His wife, Halimah binti Mohd Daim, was from Gopeng, Perak. She died in April 2005. They had 2 sons and 3 daughters. He died on August 31, 1976, at the age of 69 years.

The Government English Secondary School (GESS) in Tapah was renamed as SM Buyong Adil Tapah in 1977.

== Bibliography ==
- Sejarah Pahang
- Sejarah Perak
- Sejarah Sarawak
- Sejarah Selangor
- Sejarah Johor
- Sejarah Perlis
- Sejarah Negeri Sembilan
- Sejarah Kedah
- Sejarah Terengganu
- Sejarah Kelantan
- Sejarah Melaka: Dalam zaman kerajaan Melayu
- Sejarah Singapura: Rujukan khas mengenai peristiwa sebelum tahun 1824
- Sejarah Alam Melayu Penggal IV
- Sejarah Melayu V
- Geliga bachaan: Bagi pelajaran orang dewasa
- Sang Sapurba jadi Raja Palembang
- The History of Malacca during the period of the Malay Sultanate (Siri pelajaran menengah DBP)
- 62 Standard One National Language lessons
- Sejarah Sabah
