= Mansur Shah II of Pahang =

Mansur Shah II منصور شاه
- Sultan of Pahang
- Reign: 1555–1560
- Predecessor: Zainal Abidin Shah
- Successor: Abdul Jamal Shah
- Died: 1560
- Spouse: Raja Putri Fatima; Raja Bakal
- Issue: Raja Saleh; Raja Jalil; Raja Putri Putih; Raja Putri Tengah; Raja Putri Dewi
Regnal name
- Paduka Sri Sultan Mansur Shah II ibni al-Marhum Sultan Zainal Abidin Shah
Posthumous name
- Marhum Syahid
- House: Malacca
- Father: Zainal Abidin Shah
- Mother: Raja Putri Dewi
- Religion: Sunni Islam

Sultan Mansur Shah II ibni Almarhum Sultan Zainal Abidin Shah (died 1560) was the eighth Sultan of Pahang reigning from 1555 to 1560. He succeeded his father Sultan Zainal Abidin Shah on his death in 1555.

== Early life ==
Known as Raja Mansur before his accession, he was the eldest son of the seventh Sultan of Pahang, Zainal Abidin Shah by his wife, Raja Putri Dewi, daughter of Sultan Mahmud Shah of Malacca. Mansur Shah II first married Raja Putri Fatima, elder daughter of Sultan Alauddin Riayat Shah II of Johor by his wife, Raja Puspa Dewi. After the death of his first wife he married Putri Bakal binti Raja Ahmad, daughter of Raja Ahmad bin Raja Muhammad of Terengganu.

== Death ==
According to the classical Malay text, Bustanus Salatin, Mansur Shah II was killed in a battle against the Javanese Hindus in Southern Pahang in 1560.

== Bibliography ==
- Ahmad Sarji, Abdul Hamid (2011), The Encyclopedia of Malaysia, vol. 16 - The Rulers of Malaysia, Editions Didier Millet, ISBN 978-981-3018-54-9
- Khoo, Gilbert (1980), From Pre-Malaccan period to present day, New Straits Times
- Suria Fadhillah Md Fauzi; Zarith Sofiah Othman; Sharifah Shatrah Syed Hamid (2014), Undang-Undang Tubuh Kerajaan Pahang: Raja Pemerintah Sebagai Simbol Kuasa dan Kedaulatan Negeri, International Conference on Law, Policy and Social Justice, archived from the original on 2015-06-20
- Melayu Online, The Pahang Sultanate, archived from the original on 2014-11-09
- N.A. Halim (1998), "Sultan Mansur Syah dibunuh Jawa kafir", Utusan Malaysia, archived from the original on 2017-03-29

Mansur Shah II of Pahang House of Malacca Died: 1560
Regnal titles
| Preceded by Zainal Abidin Shah | Sultan of Pahang; 1555–1560 | Succeeded by Abdul Jamal Shah |
