= Hulubalang =

Hulubalang (Jawi: هولوبالڠ) were the military nobility of the classical Malay kingdoms in Southeast Asia. In western sources, "Hulubalang" is roughly translated as "warlord", "commander", "general" or simply "warrior". An early literary reference to the word Hulubalang appears in the Malay Annals. It is mentioned in the text that among four senior nobles of Kingdom of Singapura (1299–1398), there was a position called Hulubalang Besar (Grand Hulubalang), first held by Tun Tempurung, that equivalent to chief of staff of the army, who commands several other Hulubalangs. The legendary strongman of Singapura, Badang, was among the notable Hulubalang of the kingdom, promoted to the rank during the reign of Sri Rana Wikrama.

In the 15th century Malacca Sultanate, the rank of Grand Hulubalang as the head of all Hulubalangs was preserved but more commonly known with the title 'Seri Bija Diraja' in the Malay Annals. Among the most notable Seri Bija Diraja of Malacca was Tun Hamzah who lived during the reign of Mansur Shah. He was commonly known for his role along with Tun Perak, in leading the Malaccan army to victory against the Siamese invaders and in the conquest of Pahang. As Malacca experiencing rapid expansion of its influence as a maritime empire in mid-15th century, it requires a similar office to control its naval forces separately, thus the rank of Laksamana (grand admiral) was created, first held by Hang Tuah.

In Aceh Sultanate, Iskandar Muda (1583–1636) established a new nobility of warlords called ulèebalang, whom he gave districts (mukim) in feudal tenure. After his reign, however, the elite often supported weaker sultans, in order to maintain their own autonomy. In Brunei Sultanate, the rank of Manteri Hulubalang (officials of defence) refers to lower ranking non-noble traditional officials.
