= Alauddin Riayat Shah of Malacca =

7th Sultan of Malacca

Alauddin Riayat Shah
- 7th Sultan of Malacca
- Reign: Malacca Sultanate: 1477 – 1488
- Predecessor: Mansur Shah
- Successor: Mahmud Shah
- Died: 1488
- Spouse: Raja Fatimah(his cousin); Tun Senaja (niece of Temenggung Seri Maharaja)
- Issue: Mahmud Shah
- Father: Mansur Shah
- Religion: Sunni Islam

Sultan Alauddin Riayat Shah ibni Almarhum Sultan Mansur Shah (died 1488) was a sultan of the Malacca Sultanate from 1477 to 1488.

He was famous for going undercover at night to personally check on the well-being of his people, as well as on the condition of his sultanate itself. On one of these nights he was even reported to have run after a thief himself. However, his position is envied by his brother, Raja Ahmad (the ruler of Pahang, a region under Malaccan rule), because Raja Ahmad believed that the rulership of Malacca was his right.

Sultan Alauddin had many enemies, both within and outside of his court. He had a total of four children, two from each of his two wives, and this has led to his wives squabbling over the heirship to his throne. The sultan's second wife is from Indian Muslim descent. During this period, Sultan Alaudin has been facing problems with the mamak people, who were beginning to grow in power in comparison to Malays. His new advisor, Bendahara Seri Maharaja (equivalent to the modern-day prime minister) was also of mamak blood.

After 11 years on the throne, Sultan Alauddin was reported in history to have died of mysterious causes. Other accounts suggest that he was poisoned in a conspiracy primarily involving Raja Ahmad, Bendahara Seri Maharaja and Tun Senaja, his second wife. His son, Raja Mahmud and his brother-in-law Raja Merlang (Tun Senaja's brother) was also thought to be involved.

After his demise, the rulership went to Raja Mahmud, whom he fathered with his Tun Senaja, and denying Raja Munawar, Sultan Alaudin's firstborn son with his first wife Raja Fatimah, who was widely thought to be the true successor to the throne. In any case, the mamak bloodline finally gained control over the Malaccan Empire. However, it was not long before the Portuguese invasion came in 1511, the aftermath of which ended the Sultanate rule over the Malacca.

Today, Sultan Alauddin Riayat Shah's tomb can be found situated in Pagoh, Johor.

Alauddin Riayat Shah of Malacca House of Malacca Died: 1488
Regnal titles
Preceded by Mansur Shah	Sultan of Malacca; 1477–1488	Succeeded by Mahmud Shah
