= Mansur Shah of Malacca =

Sultan of Malacca (r. 1459–1477)

Mansur Shah
- 6th Sultan of Malacca
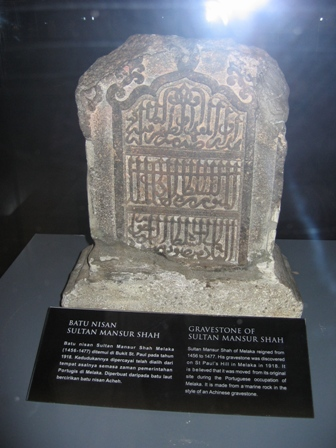
- exhibition of Mansur Shah tombstone in National Museum of Malaysia
- Reign: Malacca Sultanate: 1456–1477
- Predecessor: Muzaffar Shah
- Successor: Alauddin Riayat Shah
- Died: 1477
- Spouse: Hang Li Po; Raden Galoh Cendera Kirana; Puteri Wanang Sri Lela Wangsa; Puteri Bakal; Tun Putih Nur Pualam
- Issue: Alauddin Riayat Shah; Ahmad Shah I; Muhammad Shah; Paduka Mimat; Raden Kalang
- Father: Muzaffar Shah
- Religion: Sunni Islam

Sultan Mansur Shah ibni Almarhum Sultan Muzaffar Shah (Jawi: سلطان منصور شاه ابن المرحوم سلطان مظفر شاه; died 1477) was the 6th Sultan of Malacca from 1459 to 1477. He ascended the throne after the death of his father, Muzaffar Shah. He's also one of the capable sultans of Malacca because of his conquests he led to, and which during the times where Malacca Sultanate reached at its greatest territorial extent during his rule. (Note: One of the sultan who also spread the islam territories in Sumatra and in Southern Thailand.)

== Palace ==
According to Sherwin, there were a bit documents about the Mansur Shah palace and the constructions at that time during his control over Malacca Sultanate influences in the 15th century. Sherwin also specifically said that this palace was one of the most detailed historical buildings in all Malay historical sources, and certainly has a few rivals anywhere in the world as such a succinct and down-to-earth descriptions of a building that is such a antiquity. Unlike the rest of majority with other cultures of comparable historical records, there is no actual trace at all that is left on the buildings from the age in the Malay Peninsula, so that the written sources becomes even more important of the reconstruction of the architectural history.

After the death of Mansur Shah, the buildings of his palace were completely razed off later due to the fact of the Portuguese capturing Malacca in 1511, making much of the influences which ruled under Malacca Sultanate in 1511 collapse in Malay Peninsula. Others of the territories outside of Malay Peninsula remains.

=== Modern era ===
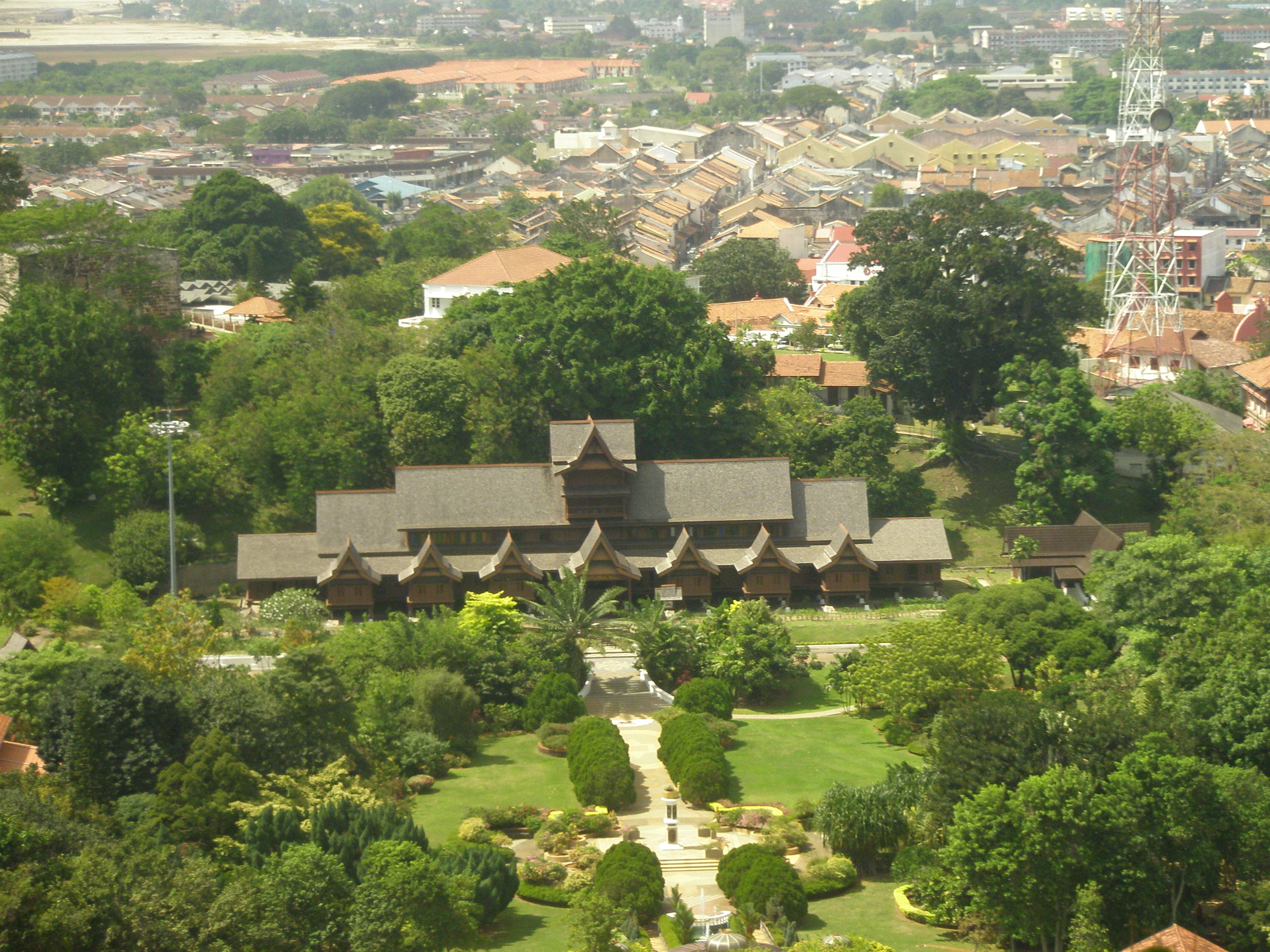
Replica of Mansur Shah palace in Malacca, Malaysia

The former prime minister of Malaysia, Mahathir Mohamad funded reconstruction of a replica of the Mansur Shah palace, which opened on the 17th of July 1984 by the government of himself. Much were made in hardwoods, while the roof of the palace is made of a "belian" wood. (Note: it is also much identically copied from the Malay Annals.) Nowadays, the replica of the palace is now discern to be type of museum in the modern days of Malaysia in Malacca.

== Expansions ==
Mansur Shah implemented a policy of expansionism during his rule. Many territories in Malay Peninsula and eastern Sumatra and the surrounding islands, such as Perak, Bernam, while Siak became Malacca's vassal. Several states unsuccessfully asserted their autonomy such as Pahang, Kampar and Inderagiri. This led one of Mansur's son to be leader of Pahang. Manjung, Rupat, Singapore, and Bintan, were under the control of Malacca during his rule.

== Marriage alliances ==
Mansur Shah also used marriage alliances between princesses of Malacca and the rulers of conquered states, such as the marriage between the king of Siak to Mansur Shah's daughter, Princess Mahadewi, to strengthen Malacca's control over those states. Such alliances were a factor in Islam's expansion in maritime Southeast Asia. Siantan and Indragiri in Sumatra were also given to Malacca as dowry for his marriage to the princess of Majapahit.

Princess Hang Li Po remains a mystery/myth today because there are no records in Ming Dynasty sources with the surname of Hang or a princess named Li Po. Emperor Yongle had only 5 princesses, Princess Yong'an (永安公主; 1377–1417), Princess Ancheng (安成公主; 1384–1443), Princess Yongping (永平公主; 1379–1444), Princess Xianning (咸寧公主; 1385–1440) and Princess Changning (常寧公主; 1387–1408). During Sultan Mansur's reign of power, the Emperor of the Ming Dynasty was Emperor Yingzong (1457–1464), instead of Emperor Yongle.

Princesses of conquered states, such as Princess Wanang Seri of Pahang and Raden Galoh Candra Kirana, were also married to the Sultan of Malacca.

== Economic policy ==
Mansur Shah reduced taxes on trade items during his reign, which increased the interest of merchants in trading through Malacca. A preferential tariff system was introduced whereby a 6% tax was levied on the trade of merchants from west of Malacca, such as Arabia and India, and a 3% tax was levied on the trade of merchants from Maritime Southeast Asia. Merchants from China, Japan and Java were not taxed at all. Malacca also offered the economic advantage of easy access to laborers.

== Spread of Islam ==
Mansur Shah, who had an interest in Islam, encouraged scholarship in Islamic theological studies, and studied Sufism himself. He studied under Maulana Abu Bakar, who brought the Ab Darul Manzum scriptures to Malacca. He ordered the translation of the scripture to Malay by Makhdum Patakan. Mansur Shah referred to scholars from Pasai on religious issues due to their expertise.

== Tombstone ==
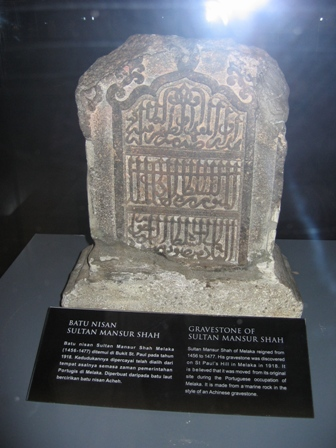
The tombstone of Mansur Shah, with various of the text as it indicates in the screenshot of Tombstone inscriptions and others

There are many theories about the Mansur Shah tombstone. At the time supposedly in June 1918, the author name Jean Pierre Moquette had been given the description of the tomb, which was given to him by Richard Olaf Winstedt, purporting to be the sultan Mansur Shah tombstone. The two stones were given to him later, and then it was seen to be no-way matched, either its in shape or ornament or workmanship. The headstone was once undoubtedly placed on a tomb, while the other one belongs to an artistic form that lies on the ground.

The plate on one of the two stones of Mansur Shah was deciphered, allegedly by Jean Pierre Moquette. With assistance on his side to help his decipherment works, Moquette, include those others of the teamers cast, was finally able to decipher the meanings of the inscriptions. They were also able to reconstruct damaged words, certainly to get the exact readings on the plate, including names and dates. Formerly, the author John Coney Moulton kindly sent the requested images of the stone to Moquette, of all of the four sides which are placed in the cement pedestal for better preservation. The reading from the first plate on its obverse says:

Hadzihi al-raudzat al-mukaddasat al-mutahharat al-zawiyat al-safiyat al-munawwarat lil Sultan al-adil al-badzil al-Sultan Mansur Shah bin Muzaffar Shah al-marhum

The second plate on its reverse reads as follows:

Kad intakala min dar al-mahal ila daramai yaum al-arbaa min Rajah sanai thanatein wa thamanin wa thapnan mi ah min al-Hijrah al-Nubawyah al-mustafaw.

This readings of the two plates were then translated to English as:

"This is the consecrated the holy grave the brilliant illuminated tomb of the just Sultan, the magnanimous ruler Sultan Mansur Shah son of the deceased Muzaffar Shah. He removed from this mortal abode to the abode of hope on Wednesday of Rajab in the year 882 after the Hijrah of the Prophet, the Chosen One."

Moreover, Richard Olaf Winstedt was also given the inscriptions purporting to be the exact of Mansur Shah stone. Mister Hervey had got the two inscriptions transcribed, and had told Mr. Blagden that the tomb however still exist. Blagden told to Winstedt that if he could whether trace it. On a visit to Malacca, Winstedt found the two stones of the tomb that was placed against the wall of the residency; Mr. Wolferstan had kindly arranged for them to be photographed and also undertook to take the steps for their preservation. According to Herveys version, the inscription of the at the bottom (or left) of the first plate decipher as it follows;

Hadza raudzat al-mukaddasat wa'l-daulat al-tamih, al-matharat al-Sultan al-munawar al-adil al-malik al-badzil al-Sultan al-mctrhum Mansur Shah, had antakala min dar al-mahal ila dar al-wirad yaum al-arbaa sanai dua Rajah wa thamanin wa thaman mi'ah.

For the whole translation of what it says there:

This is the tomb of the illustrious high and righteous glorious and just Sultan, the beneficent prince, the ruler loved of God, Mansur Shah. He departed this mortal abode for the abode of bliss on Wednesday, the second day of the month of Rejab in the year of the Hegira (Hijra) 880."

There are inscriptions on the two edges of the stone, which likely says and besides of is meanings: "Al-asma al-dufana al-Sultan al-Ali" (meaning: "The name of the deceased, the most exalted Sultan").

== Bibliography ==
- Moquette, J.P.; Winstedt, R.O. (1922). "The Grave-Stone of Sultan Mansur Shah of Malacca (14584477 A. D.)". Journal of the Straits Branch of the Royal Asiatic Society (85): 1–3. JSTOR 41561387.
- Sherwin, M.D. (1981). "A new reconstruction of the palace of Sultan Mansur Shah of Malacca". Journal of the Malaysian Branch of the Royal Asiatic Society. 54 (1 (239)): 10. JSTOR 41492895.

Mansur Shah of Malacca House of Malacca Died: 1477
Regnal titles
Preceded by Muzaffar Shah	Sultan of Malacca; 1456–1477	Succeeded by Alauddin Riayat Shah
