= Walinong Sari =

Pahang Malay legendary princess

In Pahang Malay folklore, Walinong Sari (Jawi: والينوڠ ساري) was a legendary princess of Inderapura renowned for her beauty and fighting skills. The tale of the princess was immortalized in a folk song named after her.

== The legend ==
Princess Walinong Sari was said to have lived in Inderapura, in the Old Pahang Kingdom. She is described as an exceptionally beautiful princess with a strong character. Highly skilled with spears and swords, she was renowned for her mastery of silat, the Malay martial art.

As the tales of her beauty and skills spread across the neighboring kingdoms, many came to ask for her hand in marriage, but the princess found none of them acceptable. Her father became worried about finding a suitable husband for his daughter. At the same time, the celestial king, Raja Mambang Segara, whose abode was also Mount Tahan, heard of the princess. He was intrigued by her stories and decided to find out the truth about her. Disguised as an ugly man, he came down from the mountain to look for her.

When he finally got an audience with the princess, Raja Mambang Segara found that she kept her face covered with a veil all the time. He decided to test her silat skills by challenging her to a duel, claiming that he could defeat her. This was a challenge the princess could not resist for she had never lost a fight. At an agreed time and place, the duel started. As both of them were equally good warriors, the duel prolonged for three days and three nights. But at the end of the third day, the princess’s veil fell off, exposing her extraordinary beauty to Raja Mambang Segara for the first time. The king was instantly stunned by her beauty, and immediately fainted.

When they washed him, his true appearance emerged and Princess Walinong Sari fell in love with him. But when the celestial king’s father, Raja Laksamana Petir, saw the events unfold from the peak of Mount Tahan, he became very angry, for no celestial being could faint or lose a fight with a mere mortal beauty. He threw bolts of thunder and lightning at Inderapura, and, when the storm was over, Raja Mambang Segara had disappeared into thin air. Later that night, Princess Walinong Sari had a dream, in which a wise man told her that Raja Mambang Segara was the celestial king of Mount Tahan. After she awoke the next day, she disappeared from the palace to look for her beloved, never to be seen again.

== Folk song ==
The story is referenced in the folk song Walinong Sari. Among the earliest contemporary renditions of the song was by Rafeah Buang who included the song in her album Bingkisan dari Pahang which she dedicated solely to Pahang folk songs. Another famous rendition was by Siti Nurhaliza, who included the song in her duet album, Seri Balas (1999).

Jawi script	Rumi script	English translation
والينوڠ له يڠ ساري	Walinong la yang sari	Walinong Sari
ڤوتري يڠ چنتيق	Puteri yang cantik	The beautiful princess
داتڠڽ دري ڤونچق ݢونوڠ تاهن	Datangnya dari puncak Gunung Tahan	Coming from the peak of Mount Tahan
ڤونچق ݢونوڠ ليدڠ، ݢونوڠله بانڠ	Puncak Gunung Ledang, Gununglah Banang	Peak of Mount Ledang, Mount Banang
تورونله برماءين دتامن سايڠ	Turunlah bermain di taman sayang	Coming down to play in the garden, my dear
ممتيق بوڠا٢، مڽوسون بوڠا٢	Memetik bunga-bunga, menyusun bunga-bunga	Plucking flowers, arranging those flowers
ددالم تامن	Di dalam taman	In the garden
والينوڠ له يڠ ساري	Walinong la yang sari	Walinong Sari
ڤوتري يڠ چنتيق	Puteri yang cantik	The beautiful princess
ڤنداي مڽابوڠ ڤنداي	Pandai menyabung pandai	Skillful at game fowl
برسيلت ݢايوڠ، ڤنداي ملمبوڠ لمبيڠ	Bersilat gayung, pandai melambung lembing	Performing silat gayung, skillful at throwing spears
ڤنداي ملمبوڠ	Pandai melambung	Skillful at throwing
والينوڠ له يڠ ساري	Walinong la yang sari	Walinong Sari
ڤوتري بيستاري	Puteri bestari	The wise princess
داتڠله ماري	Datanglah mari	Come here
داتڠ ممباوا تالم	Datang membawa talam	Come with a tray
داتڠله ماري	Datanglah mari	Come here
والينوڠ له يڠ ساري	Walinong la yang sari	Walinong Sari
ڤوتري بيستاري	Puteri bestari	The wise princess
داتڠ ممباوا تورون	Datang membawa turun	Coming while bringing down
ممباوا ڤايوڠ	Membawa payung	Bringing an umbrella
ڤايوڠ بروارنا كونيڠ	Payung berwarna kuning	A yellow umbrella
ممباوا ڤايوڠ	Membawa payung	Bringing an umbrella
والينوڠ له يڠ ساري	Walinong la yang sari	Walinong Sari
ڤوتري بيستاري	Puteri bestari	The wise princess
داتڠ ممباوا تالم	Datang membawa talam	Come with a tray
تالم داري كايڠن	Talam dari kayangan	A tray from the fairyland
ممباوا تالم	Membawa talam	Bringing a tray
والينوڠ له يڠ ساري	Walinong la yang sari	Walinong Sari
ڤوتري بيستاري	Puteri bestari	The wise princess
ڤوتري يڠ چنتيق دري ݢونوڠ بانڠ	Puteri yang cantik dari gunung Banang	The beautiful princess from Mount Banang
دري ݢونوڠ تاهن، ݢونوڠله ليدڠ	Dari gunung Tahan, gununglah Ledang	From Mount Tahan, Mount Ledang
تورونله هاي توان	Turunlah hai tuan	Please come down, dear master
تورون سݢرا	Turun segera	Come down quickly
ممتيق بوڠا٢	Memetik bunga-bunga	Plucking the flowers
مڽوسون بوڠا٢	Menyusun bunga-bunga	Arranging the flowers
ددالم تامن	Di dalam taman	In the garden
ڤوتري يڠ چنتيق	Puteri yang cantik	The beautiful princess
هاي..دري كايڠن	Hai... dari kayangan	Dear...from the fairyland

== In popular culture ==
- The princess became the subject of Ore Struck Media's and Universiti Tunku Abdul Rahman's (UTAR) animated short film, Walinong Sari which was released in 2022. The short film premiered at the New York International Short Film Festival, Sea Of Art Film Festival in Norway, Los Angeles International Film Festival and the Oniros Film Awards New York among others.

== See also ==
- History of Pahang
- Women warriors in literature and culture
  - List of women warriors in folklore

== Bibliography ==
- Othman Puteh; Aripin Said (1995), Himpunan 366 Cerita Rakyat Malaysia ('A Collection of 366 Malaysian folk tales'), Utusan Publication, ISBN 9789676105059
- Raman Krishnan (2013), Legendary Princesses of Malaysia, Oyez Books, ISBN 9789670481098
