= Saba dance =

Traditional Malay dance

Saba dance (Malay: Tarian Saba) is a traditional Malay dance originated in the state of Terengganu, Malaysia. It is a ritualistic dance that was used for healing purposes.

The dance are usually performed in the evenings which can be held for about two or three days. Before such performance could be held, the lead performer called Abang Peduang needs to do of what is called Upacara Memanggil Dewa (God calling ceremony) so that the healing process can be done smoothly. During the Saba ceremony, performers make various animal movements around the Saba tree made out of young coconuts in order to appease spirits and also for bountiful harvests for the next season. The Saba musicians usually use traditional musical instruments such as Gong, Rebana and Umbang (including Anok Umbang, a musical instrument unique to the dance).

== History ==
Saba healing rituals have already existed in Terengganu since the 13th century during the transitional period from Hindu-Buddhist beliefs to Islam. The modern form of Saba dance according to historians are said to have been created by a local bomoh (shaman) by the name of Che Mek Comot in the early 18th century in what is now Kuala Jengai in Dungun district on the southern part of the state. Based on its rituals, the dance incorporated pre-Islamic beliefs and rituals which existed since the time before Islam first arrived in Terengganu, of which the local people at that time still adhere to Hindu-Buddhist beliefs syncretize with ancient animistic (and later Islamic) beliefs.

== Saba dance songs ==
There are originally 33 songs used for Saba dance, below are the ones that are most widely used. The names of these dances are written in Terengganuan (the language used for most of Saba songs and rituals) along with Standard Malay translations;

- Anok Bughong Baniong (Anak Burung Baniong)
- Anok Tedung (Anak Tedung)
- Awang Kasing Gile (Awang Kasim Gila)
- Nong Sakti
- Mude di Awang (Muda di Awan)
- Anok Udang (Anak Udang)
- Ghaje Budok (Raja Budak)
- Anok Ujang (Anak Hujan)
