= Balai dance =

Traditional Malay dance

Balai
- Native name: Tarian Balai; Tarian Ulai
- Origin: Terengganu (Malaysia)

Balai dance (Malay: Tarian Balai, Terengganu Malay: Tariang Bala/Ula) or Ulai dance is a traditional Malay dance originated from what is now the district of Hulu Terengganu in the state of Terengganu, Malaysia. It is performed usually by women during the harvest season (Musim Menuai) as a way to appease the spirits of paddy crops for this year's harvest and to seek bountiful harvests for the next season.

== History ==
Origins of Balai dance remains largely unknown as stories regarding the dance is mainly based on oral history. Based on local accounts, the dance were first started more than 300 years ago by two farmers by the name of Tok Senik and Tok Jambul from Kampung Bukit Gemuruh in Hulu Terengganu. One day, when Tok Senik was singing her daughter to sleep, she heard a voice that reciprocates her lullaby and this continues even when she continued working in the paddy fields as she recites poems.

Her husband Tok Jambul also experienced the same thing as one day while he was sleeping, a mysterious man appeared in his dream telling him that a group of jinns wanted to have fun with his wife. In order for the jinns to not disturb his wife, the man instructed Tok Jambul to stick several pulai trees and splash tepung tawar unto it. After the incident, the jinns no longer disturb his wife and the harvest becomes bountiful. Tok Senik and Tok Jambul continued the tradition until it became the Balai dance.

== Description ==
The dance involves a number of local village women which would gather around a pulai tree and an umbrella-like structure called Balai (originally called Payung Buoh or Fruit Umbrella) which is decorated with colourful smaller umbrellas, clothes and leaves. These women would dressed in a typical farming clothing and brought farming tools with them, then they would dance around the Balai based on movements relating to farming such as plowing the land, pounding rice and tiling farms while singing songs or chanting poems (pantun) which contains not only about paddy and to appease paddy spirits but also advice and examples. The dance accompanied by two drums and a gong usually done by male musicians. Before the dance ends, they will plough a small pulai tree from its place and put it beside the Balai.

Modern contemporary versions of Balai dance usually includes male dancers dancing alongside female dancers and no longer limited to dancing at the paddy fields. The dance has evolved into more of a cultural dance instead of worshipping ceremony.
