= Pahang Malay =

Malayan language

- بهاس ملايو ڤهڠ
- Base Pahang, Cakak Pahang
- Native to: Malaysia
- Region: Pahang, Terengganu (Pasir Raja in Hulu Dungun)
- Ethnicity: Pahang Malays
- Language family: Austronesian: Malayo-Polynesian; (disputed); Malayic; Pahang Malay

Language codes
- ISO 639-3: –
- Glottolog: paha1256

Pahang Malay (Standard Malay: Bahasa Melayu Pahang; Jawi: بهاس ملايو ڤهڠ) is a Malayic language spoken in the Malaysian state of Pahang centre of the Malay Peninsula. It is locally considered a "dialect" (loghat; hence also known as loghat Pahang) under the "Malay" umbrella and regarded as the dominant one spoken along the vast riverine systems of Pahang, but co-exists with other Malay loghat traditionally spoken in the state. Along the coastline of Pahang, Terengganu Malay is spoken in a narrow strip of sometimes discontiguous fishing villages and towns. Another dialect spoken in Tioman island is a distinct Malay variant and most closely related to Riau Archipelago subdialect spoken in Natuna and Anambas islands in the South China Sea, together forming a dialect continuum between the Malay dialects of Borneo and those of the mainland Peninsula and Sumatra.

Nonetheless, the essential unity of Pahang and Terengganu Malay is demonstrated by the number of shared lexical, syntactic, and phonetics innovations. Both varieties, along with Kelantan Malay, have been classified under the subgroup of the East Coast dialect of the Malay Peninsula, due to their possible common origin.

Pahang Malay is known for its sharp rise and fall of tone and quick flowing accent. It exhibits a number of differences from the standardized "formal" Malay used nationally with other Malaysian states, particularly in phonology and vocabulary. Even though it shares many similarities with standard Malay, the dialect in its purest form remains unintelligible to standard Malay speakers. There are a number of sub-dialects of Pahang Malay identified by linguists, but the form spoken in the vicinity of Pahang's royal capital, Pekan, is considered as its 'standard sub-dialect'.

The dialect is traditionally written in Jawi script, but its role as the main writing language has been replaced with Standard Malay written in Rumi. A local radio station, Pahang FM, broadcasts in this dialect.

== Name ==
Pahang Malay is natively referred to as base Pahang (/basɘ pahã(ŋ)/; Standard Malay: bahasa Pahang; بهاس ڤهڠ), or cakak Pahang (/tʃakaʔ pahã(ŋ)/; Standard Malay: cakap Pahang; چاكڤ ڤهڠ). However, in academic writings, it is alternatively known as bahasa Melayu Pahang or dialek Pahang. The term Pahang itself originated from the name of the state which in turn derived from the name of Pahang River, where the early civilisation in the state could have developed from. There have been many theories on the origin of the name Pahang. Local lore states that it is derived from the corruption of the name Mahang tree (Macaranga). On the other hand, William Linehan relates the early foundation of the state to the settlers from the ancient Khmer civilisation, and claims it originates from the word saamnbahang (Khmer: សំណប៉ាហាំង) meaning 'tin', abundantly found in the state. The earliest literary reference to the name 'Pahang' was from the chronicle of the Liu Song dynasty, Book of Song, which records two consecutive envoys received from the kingdom of 'Pohuang' (alternatively Panhuang) between 449 and 457 CE.

== Origin ==
There are at least two theories on the origin of Pahang Malay. Asmah Omar identifies the settlements near the estuary of Pahang River and its adjacent areas, where the early civilisation of Pahang could have begun, as the place of origin of the dialect before it was diffused inland. This area includes Pekan, the historical capital of Pahang, which the subdialect of Pahang Malay spoken in the area is named after. This theory is consistent to the known details of Malay settlement patterns in Southeast Asia. Until the 19th century, the Malay population was riverine and maintaining inter-communal link by river and maritime routes.

Another theory by Tarmizi Harsah, suggests that the dialect originated from Ulu Tembeling, in deep hinterland of Pahang. The theory is based on the study of a variant spoken in Ulu Tembeling, also known locally as cakap ulu ('the upstream speech') or base lama ('the old language'). Although it retains part of the general characteristics of Pahang Malay, the dialect of Ulu Tembeling has the special feature of consonantal diphthongisation at the end of words, which is one of its kind among Malay dialects of the peninsula. Another unique feature of the dialect is that it retains several phonological characteristics of Ancient Malay, for example, the use of vowel *i and *u, and the addition of glottal consonant at the last position in words ending with vowels. However, Tarmizi's theory went against the commonly accepted Malay settlement patterns which began at the river mouth and coastal areas before dispersing inland.

== Distribution ==
Pahang Malay is almost exclusively spoken within the state of Pahang, though there are sizeable migrant communities of its native speakers in urban areas like Klang Valley, and other states of the peninsula. Nevertheless, within the state of Pahang, there are at least two other distinct Malay varieties traditionally spoken. Coastal Terengganu Malay, a relative variant with shared lexical, synctatic, and phonetics innovations, is spoken in narrow strip of sometimes discontiguous fishermen villages and towns along the coastline of Pahang. This complicated spatial layering of different Malay variants, often within a few kilometres' radius between hamlets of Pahang Malay speakers along the riverine systems and the Terengganu-speaking coastal fishermen villages, is influenced by the historical movement of Terengganu Malays to that area. For centuries, the coastal line stretching from Terengganu border to the Endau of Johor, was the heaven for temporary settlements of fishermen from Terengganu and Kelantan who came there during fishing season. Over the time, a well established communities began to develop in areas like Beserah, Kuala Pahang, and Kuala Rompin. Another dialect, not related to Pahang Malay, is spoken in Tioman island of Pahang and Aur Islands of Johor, and most closely related only to Sarawak Malay, spoken across the South China Sea in northwest Borneo. Despite the existence these foreign and isolated Malay variants, Pahang Malay remains as the de facto official dialect of the state, predominantly spoken along the lining of its vast riverine systems.

== Dialects and sub-dialects ==
Due to high divergences of the dialects and sub-dialects of Pahang Malay, their classifications remain unclear so far. Among the earliest attempt to classify these dialects and sub-dialects was by Asmah Omar who conducted her study based on the daerah (district). She enlisted eight sub-dialects of Pahang Malay, namely the dialects of Pekan, Benta, Raub, Ulu Tembeling, Rompin, Temerloh, Kuala Lipis and Bentong. She also named the sub-dialect spoken in the vicinity of Pekan, including the state capital, Kuantan, as the 'standard sub-dialect' and the major source for other sub-dialects spoken inland. Her view is based on the prestige of Pekan and Kuantan as the main economic, cultural and administration centres of the state.

Other scholars like Collins and Tarmizi Harsah provided an alternative method in this dialectal study, focusing on the geographic units of river basins and coastal strips, rather than on the existing political boundaries. This is based on the fact that the spread of these sub-dialects is independent of the political divisions of current Malaysian states. On the other hand, both river basins and coastal strips are the features of topography that have greatly shaped the earliest patterns of migration and settlement in the Malay world of Southeast Asia. Based on this, Tarmizi Harsah identified three main variants of Pahang Malay, spoken along the lining of three main rivers of Pahang; Pahang River, Jelai River and Lipis River. He classified these variants further into two main sub-dialects, Hulu Pahang ('Upper Pahang') consisting of the Lipis and Jelai rivers variants, and Hilir Pahang ('Lower Pahang') consisting of the Pahang River variant.

== Characteristics ==
=== Phonology ===
In general, like many other dialects of Malay language, the differences between Pahang Malay and the Standard Malay are recognized through changes in phonology at the end of the words. The unique identity of Pahang Malay can be traced in three features of phonology; vowels before consonant [± coronal], alveolar trill and diphthongs /-ai̯/ and /-au̯/. The contrast between coronals and non-coronals is among the first feature recognised by Collins (1983, 1998) and Ajid Che Kob & Mohd Tarmizi (2009). Although this feature is shared among all sub-dialects of Pahang, there are still different vowel realisation patterns found among those variants. These varied patterns are demonstrated in the following tables.

Vowel realisation patterns with coronal consonants
Word	Standard Malay	Pahang Malay			Meaning
Word	Standard Malay	Jelai River	Lipis River	Pahang River	Meaning
tangan	/taŋan/	[taŋɛ̃]	[taŋɛ̃]	[taŋæ̃]	hand
kanan	/kanan/	[kanɛ̃]	[kanɛ̃]	[kanæ]	right (direction)
tahun	/tahun/	[taʉ]	[taʉ]	[tawɛ̃]	year
daun	/da.un/	[daʉ]	[daʉ]	[dawɛ]	leaf
angin	/aŋin/	[aŋˈiː]	[aŋˈiː]	[aŋiɛ̃]	wind
sakit	/sakit/	[sakeʔ]	[sakeʔ]	[sakiɛʔ]	pain
bukit	/bukit/	[bukeʔ]	[ᵇukeʔ]	[bukiɛʔ]	hill
lutut	/lutut/	[lutʉʔ]	[ˡutʉʔ]	[lutuɛʔ]	knee
perut	/pərut/	[pəɣʉʔ]	[pəɣʉʔ]	[pəɣuɛʔ]	stomach
tumpul	/tumpul/	[tumpʉ]	[ᵗumpʉ]	[tumpuɛ]	blunt
bakul	/bakul/	[bakʉ]	[bakʉ]	[bakuɛ]	basket

Vowel realisation patterns with non-coronal consonants
Word	Standard Malay	Pahang Malay			Meaning
Word	Standard Malay	Jelai River	Lipis River	Pahang River	Meaning
tulang	/tulaŋ/	[tula]	[tulã^{ŋ}]	[tulã^{ŋ}]	Bone
abang	/abaŋ/	[aba]	[abã^{ŋ}]	[abã^{ŋ}]	older brother
hidung	/hiduŋ/	[ido]	[ido]	[idɔ̃ᵊ]	nose
jantung	/d͡ʒantuŋ/	[dʒanto]	[dʒanto]	[dʒantɔ̃ᵊ]	heart
minum	/minum/	[minũː]	[minũː]	[minɔ̃]	drink (verb)
senyum	/səɲum/	[səɲnũː]	[səɲnũː]	[səɲɔ̃ᵊ]	smile (verb)
tiup	/ti.up/	[tiʲoʔ]	[tiʲoʔ]	[tiʲɔʔ]	blow
hidup	/hidup/	[idoʔ]	[idoʔ]	[idɔʔ]	live (verb)

The Standard Malay alveolar trill /-r/, at the end of words, is usually omitted in most Malay dialects. But the omitted sound will always be replaced with certain phonetic forms, either through the elongation of consonant or de-articulation of schwa. Both forms exist in Pahang Malay and are described by linguists as 'very obvious'. Elongation of consonant can be seen in the use of [ɐː], [ɔː] and [ɛː] in sub-dialect spoken along the Jelai River, while de-articulation of schwa is shown by sub-dialects spoken along the Pahang and Lipis rivers that utilise [ɐᵊ], [ɔᵊ] and [ɛᵊ].

Word	Standard Malay	Pahang Malay			Meaning
Word	Standard Malay	Jelai River	Lipis River	Pahang River	Meaning
besar	/bəsar/	[bəsɐː]	[bəsɐᵊ]	[bəsɐᵊ]	big
bakar	/bakar/	[bakɐː]	[bakɐᵊ]	[bakɐᵊ]	burn
telur	/təlur/	[təlɔː]	[təlɔᵊ]	[təlɔᵊ]	egg
tidur	/tidur/	[tidɔː]	[tidɔᵊ]	[tidɔᵊ]	sleep
kotor	/kotor/	[kɔtɔː]	[kɔtɔᵊ]	[kɔtɔᵊ]	dirty
hilir	/hilir/	[ilɛː]	[ilɛᵊ]	[ilɛᵊ]	downstream
pasir	/pasir/	[pasɛː]	[pasɛᵊ]	[pasɛᵊ]	sand

Common diphthongs found in Standard Malay, /-ai̯/ and /-au̯/, do not exist in Pahang Malay, as both are monophthongised instead. This does not means that there are no diphthongs in the dialect at all. Pahang Malay acquired its diphthongs through the diphthongisation of monophthongs; for example, the vowel sounds /-i/ and /-u/ are diphthongised into [-ij] and [-uw]. This phenomenon is considered common among many Malay dialects. The following table shows some monophthong realisation for diphthongs /-ai̯/ and /-au̯/ in Pahang Malay.

Word	Standard Malay	Pahang Malay			Meaning
Word	Standard Malay	Jelai River	Lipis River	Pahang River	Meaning
petai	/pətai̯/	[pətɜ]	[pətɜ]	[pətɜː]	stink bean (Parkia speciosa)
semai	/səmai̯/	[səmɛ̃]	[səmɛ̃]	[səmɛ̃ː]	to sow
sungai	/suŋai̯/	[suŋɛ̃]	[suŋɛ̃]	[suŋɛ̃ː]	river
renyai	/rəɲai̯/	[ɣəɲɛ̃]	[ɣəɲɛ̃]	[ɣəɲɛ̃ː]	drizzle
kerbau	/kərbau̯/	[kəɣbɔ]	[kəɣba]	[kəɣbaː]	buffalo
pisau	/pisau̯/	[pisɔ]	[pisa]	[pisaː]	knife
pulau	/pulau̯/	[pulɔ]	[pula]	[pulaː]	island

=== Vocabulary ===
The following are selected vocabulary in Pahang Malay as compared to the "standard" Malay used in national-level Malaysian media. Some vocabulary appear to derive from terminology rarely used in Selangor and Johorean dialects base of said "standard" Malay, which are highlighted in brackets.

Meaning	Standard Malay	Pahang Malay
you	awak, anda	awok/aok
you (plural)	awak semua	wokme/aokme
to repair	baiki	bele
plastic container	bekas plastik	molor (< mulur 'flexible')
swelling	bengkak	merenin
to tell	beritahu	royek (< royat ~ riwayat 'story'); kabo (< khabar 'news')
walking side by side	berjalan beriringan	berlimbor
oily	berminyak	berlemin
sweating heavily	berpeluh banyak	berjejet
verbal argument	bertengkar	bertonyeh/bertaki
defecation	buang air besar	ronoh/perot
budu	budu	pede
shallow	cetek	tohor
careless	cuai	lepe (< alpa ~ lepa)
stubborn	degil	babir (< babil)
greed/guzzle	gelojoh	polok
severely defeated	kalah teruk	lengit
pins and needles	semut-semut, kebas kaki	sesemut, senyor
why	kenapa	ngaper, matnyer
ragged	koyak rabak	berjelobei
running helter-skelter	lari lintang pukang	bercemperidei (< bercempera)
preoccupied	leka	ralit
tired	letih	kehut/kohot/tok rot
shy	malu	kanyor
they	mereka	demeh
woozy	pening	oteng
dirty person	pengotor	habat
full	penuh	mombong (< mumbung 'filled to the brim [of boats]')
plastic bag	beg plastik	jabir
friend	kawan, sahabat	rodong
I	aku, saya	kawan, kuan, kwai, (Pekan minus coastal strip / Maran); koi (Maran excluding Jengka vicinity / Bera excluding Jempol tributaries and distinctively from Jelebu tributaries / Temerloh excluding Jengka vicinity); kawaeh, kweh, kawas (Jerantut excluding Jengka vicinity and distinctively from upper Tembeling tributaries / Lipis); komeh, kome (Lipis / Raub); keh, kaeh, kas (Lipis / Raub)
blanket	selimut	gebor
reticulated	selirat	sengkelik
to order	suruh	nyeraya
white shawl worn by Muslim women while praying	telekung	mahane
choked	tercekik	mengkelan
sleep	tidur	reloh (< reluh)
to lie	tipu	pedo'oh
mattress	tilam	lece
this one	yang ini	hok ni
that one	yang itu	hok tu

Intensifier
Standard Malay	Pahang Malay	Meaning
sangat busuk	busuk melantong	very stinky
sangat lawa	lawo mat	very beautiful (cf. lawa amat)
sangat cerah	ngerlang	very fair
sangat hitam	itang legang	very dark (cf. hitam legam)
sangat manis	manis meletiang	very sweet (cf. manis meleting)
sangat masam	masang menaung	very sour
sangat pahit	pahit lepang	very bitter
sangat tawar	tawor heber	very insipid
sangat tebal	tebal bakut	very thick
sangat wangi	wangi merohong	very fragrant

== Sample texts ==
Alternative synonyms more used in formal standard Malay are provided in rounded brackets.

Meaning	Pahang Malay	Pronunciation	Standard Malay correspondence
Wow, the rambutan is so ripe and sweet	Poh palih, manih melekang mutan ni	[pɔh paliɛh maniɛh mələkã^{ŋ} mutæ̃ ni]	Amboi, manis melekang (masak sangat) rambutan ini
If you are dirty like this you cannot go out	Kala bercerakoh macang ni tok leh gi jalan	[kalaː bətʃəɣakɔh matʃã^{ŋ} ni toʔ leh gi dʒalaæ]	Kalau kotor macam ini tidak boleh pergi jalan-jalan (bersiar-siar)
You have to see the doctor, the bomoh's job didn't work [on you]	Aok ni kene bebele dengan dokto, bomo tok jalan	[awɔʔ ni kənə bəbələ dəŋæ doʔtɔ bɔmɔ toʔ dʒalæ]	Awak ini kena berbela (berubat) dengan doktor, [berubat dengan] bomoh [sudah] tidak jalan (berkesan)
The kids are too occupied playing the galah panjang on the sand	Selok budok-budok maen tayang ataih pase	[səlɔʔ budɔʔ-budɔʔ maen tajaŋ ataç pasɛᵊ]	Leka budak-budak main galah panjang atas pasir
I don't like the child's behavior	Koi tok gemor ke pe'el budok tu	[koj toʔ gəmɔ kə peʕɛ̃ː budɔʔ tu]	Aku tidak gemar (suka) fiil (perangai) budak itu

== Bibliography ==
- Asmah Omar (2008). Susur Galur Bahasa Melayu [The Origin of Malay language] (in Malay). Kuala Lumpur: Dewan Bahasa dan Pustaka. ISBN 978-9836-298-26-3.
- Collins, James Thomas (1989). "Malay Dialect Research in Malaysia: The Issue of Perspective" (PDF). Bijdragen tot de Taal-, Land- en Volkenkunde. 145 (2): 235–264. doi:10.1163/22134379-90003253.
- Department of Statistics Malaysia (2010). "Jumlah Penduduk Mengikut Kumpulan Etnik, Mukim dan Negeri, Malaysia, 2010/Total Population by Ethnic Group, Mukim and State, Malaysia, 2010 – Pahang" (PDF) (in Malay and English). Archived from the original (PDF) on 2012-02-27.
- Guy, John (2014). Lost Kingdoms: Hindu-Buddhist Sculpture of Early Southeast Asia. New York: Metropolitan Museum of Art. ISBN 978-0300-204-37-7.
- Milner, Anthony (2010). The Malays (The Peoples of South-East Asia and the Pacific). Wiley-Blackwell. ISBN 978-1444-339-03-1.
- Pahang Delights (2005). "Radio Channels in Pahang".
- Tan, Soo Hai; Tan, Ding Eing (1978). A Portrait of Malaysia and Singapore. Oxford University Press. ISBN 978-0195-807-22-6.
- Tarmizi Hasrah; Rahim Aman; Shahidi A.H (2010). "Variasi Dialek Pahang: Keterpisahan Berasaskan Jaringan Sungai" [Variants of Pahang Dialect: Divergences Based on the Riverine System] (PDF). Jurnal Melayu (in Malay). 5. Archived from the original (PDF) on 2014-11-29.
- Tarmizi Hasrah; Rahim Aman; Shahidi A.H (2013). "Sketsa Dialek Melayu Pahang" [Sketches of Pahang Malay Dialect] (PDF). Jurnal Linguistik (in Malay). 12. Archived from the original (PDF) on 4 March 2016.
