= Terengganuan Malays =

Terengganuan Malay people
Oghang/Ughaong Tranung Melayu Terengganu / ملايو ترڠڬانو
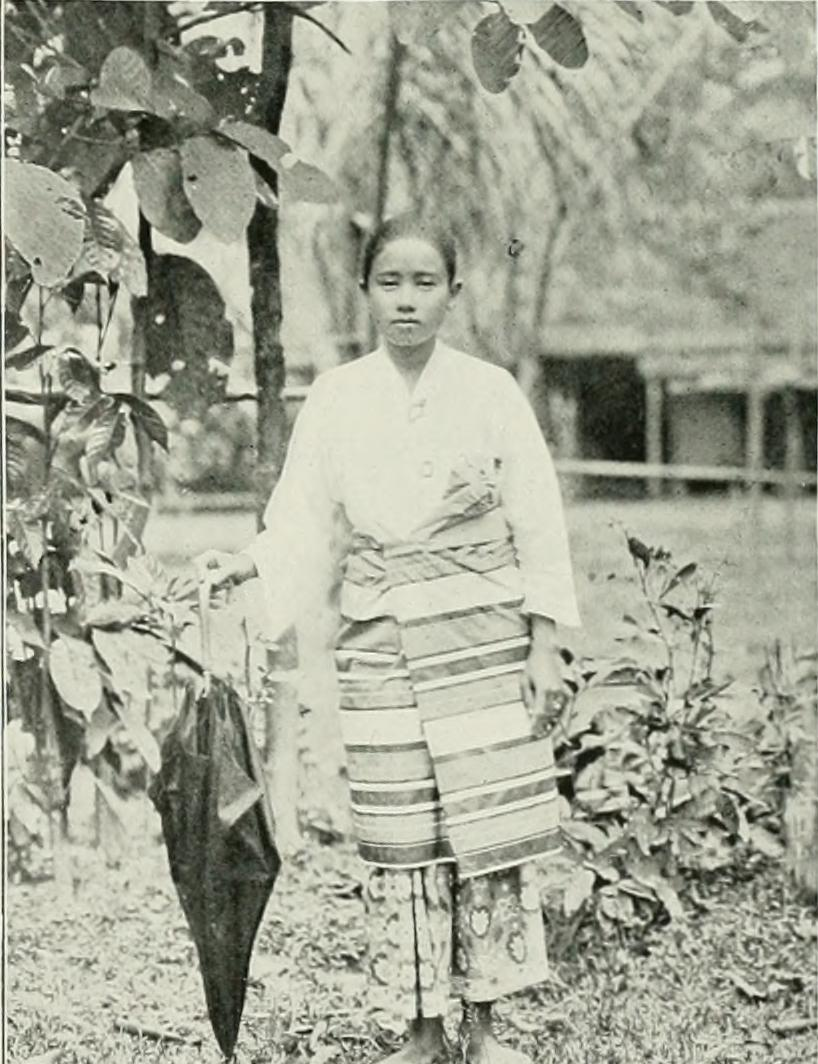
- A Terengganuan Malay woman in traditional attire, 1908.

Total population
- 1.1 million

Regions with significant populations
- Malaysia (Terengganu and significant populations in Johor (Mersing) and Pahang (Kuantan and Rompin); Indonesia (Anambas and Natuna in Riau Islands province)

Languages
- Terengganu Malay, standard Malaysian (in Malaysia), standard Indonesian (in Indonesia)

Religion
- Sunni Islam

Related ethnic groups
- Malaysian Malays (especially Kelantanese Malays, Patani Malays and Pahang Malays)

Terengganu Malays (Malaysian: Melayu Terengganu; Jawi: ملايو ترڠڬانو; Terengganu Malay: Oghang Tranung; Inland Terengganu: Ughaong Tranung), are a sub-group of Malays indigenous to the state of Terengganu, on the east coast of Peninsular Malaysia. Besides Terengganu, they can also be found in the neighbouring states of Pahang (in the districts of Kuantan, Pekan and Rompin) and Johor (especially in Mersing). The descendants of Terengganu Malays can also be found in the Anambas Islands (part of the Riau Islands province) in Indonesia. As of 2010, it is estimated that the population of Terengganuan Malays is around 1.1 million people, and they form 94% of Terengganu's population, making them the dominant ethnic group in the state.

Terengganuan Malays have maintained their own distinct culture, historical and linguistic identity from other Malays in the country. The most notable distinction is their spoken language, which is partially or mutually unintelligible to varieties of Malay in other parts of Malaysia. Terengganuans, along with the Kelantanese and Pahangites are considered as Orang Pantai Timur (People of the East Coast) due to their historical, cultural, linguistic and geographical proximity.

== Etymology ==
There are several theories on the origin of the name 'Terengganu'. One theory attributes the name's origin to terang ganu, Malay for 'bright rainbow'. Another story, said to have been originally narrated by the ninth Sultan of Terengganu, Baginda Omar, tells of a party of hunters from Pahang roving and hunting in the area of what is now southern Terengganu. One of the hunters spotted a big animal fang lying on the ground. A fellow party member asked to which animal did the fang belong. The hunter, not knowing which animal, simply answered taring anu (Malay: 'fang of something'). The party later returned to Pahang with a rich hoard of game, fur and sandalwood, which impressed their neighbours. They asked the hunters where did they source their riches, to which they replied, from the land of taring anu, which later evolved into Terengganu. Terengganu was called Trangkanu (Thai: ตรังกานู) by the Siamese when it was under their influence.

Terengganuan Malays usually refer to themselves as Oghang Tranung, Teganu, Ganung or Ganu.

== Language ==
See: Terengganu Malay

Terengganuan Malays spoke a Malayic language called Terengganu Malay or in their native language as Bahse Tranung (which means "Terengganu language") or Ccakak Tranung (which means "Terengganu Speech"). Terengganu Malay is closely related to Kelantanese Malay (Baso Kelate) and Pahang Malay (Base Pahang) and these three can easily communicated with each other despite phonological differences (as well as some vocabulary differences). However, not all Terengganuan Malay people in Terengganu use Terengganuan; in the districts of Besut and northern Setiu, Kelantanese Malay is much popular among the people there as their culture and customs are much closer to Kelantan than other parts of Terengganu. Terengganu Malay has several distinct dialects but it is divided into two major ones namely Coastal which is considered to be Terengganu Malay proper and Inland, also known as Base Ulu (Language of the inland) or Base Kole Berang (Kuala Berang language/dialect). Both varieties have a distinct phonology and vocabulary which makes the communication between the two communities quite unintelligible. Both Coastal and Inland Terengganu Malay have several sub-dialects of its own.

== Culture ==
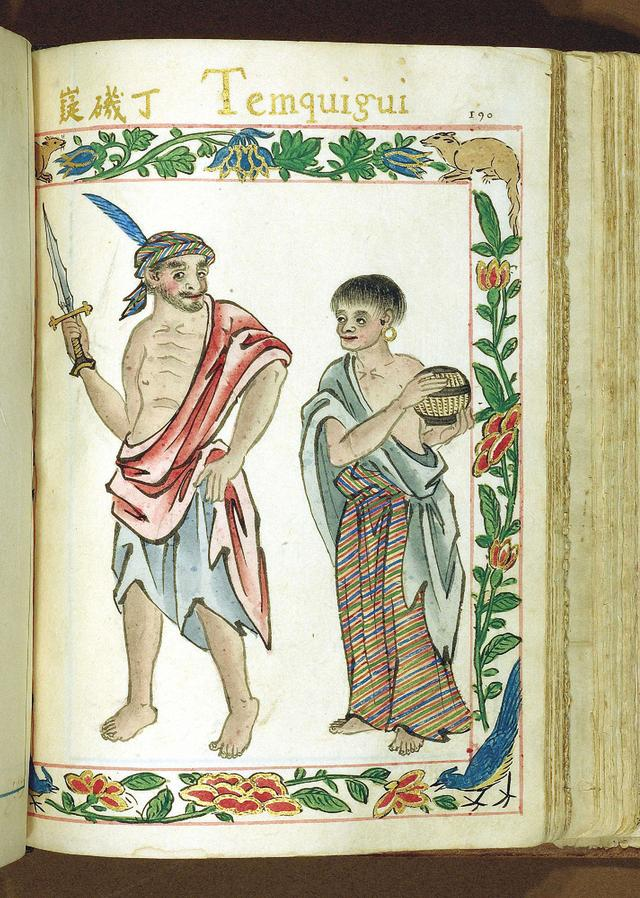
a couple from Temquigui, from Boxer Codex s. 1590.

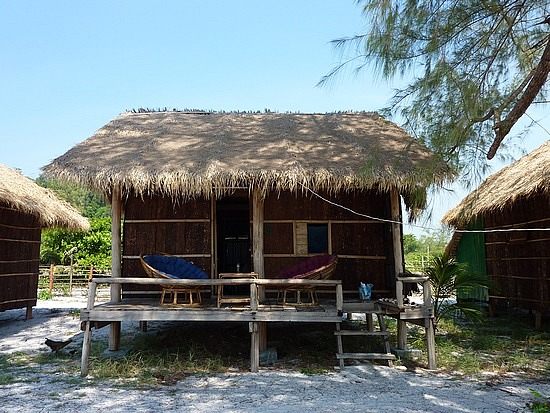
A traditional Malay house in Terengganu, also known as Rumoh Beghatak.

The Terengganuan Malay community is rich in culture and traditions and is considered as one of the "Cradles of the Malay civilization" in West Malaysia. In Terengganu, there are several types of traditional Malay theatres, such as Rodak, Teater Nur Sakti and Tariang Pula (Pulai dance), Tariang Saba (Saba dance), Tariang Bala (Balai dance) and so on. However, the most well known traditional dance of Terengganu are Tariang Ulek Mayang, the dance is usually performed by the seaside at the Pesta Puje Pata (Sea Worshipping Festival) at the end of the year and is meant to heal sickness. Nevertheless, such dances today are simply considered as cultural performance instead of using it as a worship. Like its neighbour Kelantan, Terengganu is one of Malaysia's most conservative states but the state is also known for its tolerance towards ethnic and religious minorities.

=== Food ===
Terengganu features a variety of traditional Malay dishes that contribute to Malaysia's broader culinary diversity. Notable specialties include keropok lekor - known locally by variations such as keppok gongdee, keppok panjang, keppok getel, and keppok batang - and budu, a fermented anchovy sauce also referred to as sos bilis. Another staple dish is Terengganu-style nasi dagang, which is widely served across local restaurants. Other traditional foods and kuih (bite-sized snacks or desserts) associated with the state include laksang, tahi itik, cek mek molek, akok, nganang (a variant of akok), bronok sagu, sagong, bekang nyior, belebak, nek bak, tok aji serbang, kuih tepung gomok, tupak sutong, bekang, roti paung, buoh bung samba, kuih kapur nyior, apang dewe, and apang kuoh.

=== Traditional dances ===
Besides the famous Ulek Mayang dance, there are also several unique traditional dances in the state, from Pre-Islamic dances like Saba to current folk dances like Rodat and Watimang Landok, mostly came after the arrival of Islam into the state.

- Ulek mayang dance
- Saba dance
- Watimang Landok dance
- Rodat (dance)
- Balai dance
- Ya Abang dance

=== Music ===
- Ulek mayang
- Saba
- Gamelan Terengganu

Traditional songs:

- Watimang Landok
- Anok Udang
- Ayong Bua Kokek
- Patendu Patende
- Inang Rodak
- Ulek mayang

=== Martial arts ===
- Silak Gayongman Gerak Satu (from Kuala Terengganu)
- Silak Kkughe (Silat Kura-Kura, from Hulu Terengganu)
- Silak Taghi Jatuh (Silat Tari Jatuh, from Besut)
- Silak Syed Habib Hamid

== Notable people ==
Famous Malay people from Terengganu include:

- Abdul Hadi Awang, Malaysian politician, former Chief Minister of Terengganu and member of PAS party and Parliament of Malaysia.
- Ahmad Shabery Cheek, Malaysian politician, a member of UMNO party and Parliament of Malaysia.
- Anuar Manan, Malaysian professional cyclist.
- Azizulhasni Awang, Malaysian professional track cyclist.
- Firhan Ashaari, Malaysian hockey player.
- Hairuddin Omar, Malaysian footballer.
- Haji Abdul Rahman Limbong, Terengganuan ulema and resistance fighter who fought against the British in Terengganu between 1922-1928.
- Nora Danish, Malaysian actress.
- Norshahrul Idlan Talaha, Malaysian footballer.
- Rafizi Ramli, Malaysian politician and member of PKR party and Parliament of Malaysia.
- Safawi Rasid, Malaysian footballer.
- Tan Sri Yahaya Ahmad, founder, chairman and chief executive officer of the DRB-HICOM Group of Malaysia.
- Zizan Razak, Malaysian actor, presenter, businessmen, singer, rapper and comedian.
- Wan Ahmad Hulaimi bin Wan Mohd Ali, Malaysian journalist and author of Growing up in Terengganu (2007) dan A Map of Terengganu (2011)
