= Ulek =

Ulek may refer to:

- Sambal ulek, a paste made of red chilis and salt
- Ulek mayang, pre-Islamic religious folk dance of Malaysia

Ulek may also refer to:

- The Ulek States, a group of fictional nations in the World of Greyhawk campaign setting for the Dungeons & Dragons role-playing game, including:
  - The County of Ulek
  - The Duchy of Ulek
  - The Principality of Ulek
