= Umbang =

Malaysian string instrument

- Other names: Anak Umbang, Buluh Keranting
- Classification: Bowed string instrument
- Developed: Terengganu, Malaysia

The umbang (Jawi: اومبڠ), also known as buluh keranting, is a traditional bowed string instrument originated in the state of Terengganu, Malaysia. It is mainly used for Saba dance performance.

== Description ==
The umbang is made of bamboo which has a long segment. The instrument has two rope strings with a hole in the middle. Smaller holes are poked around the instrument to produce different sound tones. The umbang is usually accompanied with a fiddle called anak umbang. The umbang is an important musical instrument as it is used by bomoh (shaman) for the Saba dance. The Saba dance is a traditional healing dance which originated from the district of Dungun, Terengganu.
