= Seri Pahang =

In Pahang Malay folklore, Seri Pahang (Jawi: سري ڤهڠ) was a legendary giant white saltwater crocodile thought to have lived in the Chini Lake, Pekan District, Pahang. He was famous for his duel with a black sea demon called Seri Kemboja that took place off the coast of Pahang. In another version of the legend, both Seri Pahang and Seri Kemboja, are described as giant serpents called Nāga.

== The legend ==
Chini Lake is the second largest natural freshwater lake in Malaysia. The Chini River, which drains from the lake, flows into the Pahang River. In the local lore, the lake and its adjoining mountain are sacred, and locals credit the place with the possession of a white crocodile styled 'Seri Pahang' (Malay for 'glory of Pahang').

According to the legend, news had reached Seri Pahang about a devastating black sea demon, Seri Kemboja (the Glory of Kemboja). He vowed to fight the demon and get rid of him. So Seri Pahang left Tasik Chini and swam downstream to Kuala Pahang. There he transformed into an old man carrying a bailing pail made of palm. In the form of the old man, Seri Pahang persuaded a group of sailors to take him on board with them. Since he had a bailing pail, they thought he might be useful if the boat needed to be bailed. His bailing pail seemed to have turmeric in it.

When the boat reached a spot southeast of Sedili Kechil, Seri Pahang handed the bailing pail to the nakhuda and jumped into the sea. He immediately turned into a giant white crocodile and the men were amazed to see that the turmeric in the dipper had turned to gold. This was their payment for giving Seri Pahang a ride to the spot where he wanted to challenge Seri Kemboja, the black demon. The fight between Seri Pahang and Seri Kemboja lasted long. The sea became dark, thunder rolled and lightning flashed. After a fierce battle, Seri Pahang managed to kill Seri Kemboja but he was wounded badly himself. In great pain, he swam away to Aur Island, transformed himself back into an old man and got a boat ride back to Kuala Pahang. Once he reached a village called Sekukoh on the Pahang River, he was getting a very weak, and told the sailors to stop at the mouth of the Chini River and made announcement that he is dying at Sekukoh. He then slipped into the water and changed instantly into a crocodile.

Soon after leaving Sekukoh, the boat passed the mouth of Chini River but it suddenly stopped moving. One of the sailors remembered the old man's request. They turned back to the Chini River and called out that a great white crocodile is dying at Sekukoh. As soon as it was delivered, the boat could move again. Before long, hundreds of crocodiles could be seen swimming downriver to Sekukoh. There were so many crocodiles in the river that, villagers living along the banks claimed that daring young men could cross the river on backs of the crocodiles. Before he died, the great white crocodile, asked the ruler of Pahang to give him a proper religious burial. After learning how the crocodile had killed the sea demon, the ruler agreed. That is how Seri Pahang came to be buried in a sandy pit near Sekukoh. The place is known to this day as Makam Tok Pahang ('Tok Pahang's Tomb').

== Relation with Pahang rulers ==
In 1914, when Sultan Ahmad died, people saw twenty six crocodiles cruising in a “V” formation in Pahang River, heading upriver. Behind them came a shoal of fish fanned out across the river. The people cast nets, but the fish magically escaped. These were a type of fish usually lives in Chini Lake. The people believed that the crocodiles and fish were coming back from the funeral of Sultan Ahmad. They had been paying their respects in gratitude, because the Sultan's ancestor had buried Seri Pahang properly at Sekukoh before he died.

== Bibliography ==
- Aripin Said (1985), Juara yang tewas, Dewan Bahasa dan Pustaka, ISBN 978-9836201423
- MacDonald, Margaret Read (2008), The Singing Top: Tales from Malaysia, Singapore, and Brunei, Libraries Unlimited, ISBN 978-1591585053
- Malaysian Legend Series (2004), The great white crocodile of Pahang, Kohwai & Young Publications, ISBN 978-9831916483
