= Seri Gumum Dragon =

Legendary giant serpent

In Pahang Malay folklore, the Seri Gumum Dragon (in Jawi script ناݢ سري ݢوموم) is a legendary giant serpent locally called Nāga and commonly described as taking the form of an Asian dragon, which is said to inhabit Chini Lake in Pahang, Malaysia. There have been a variety of legends associated with the creature in the oral literature. One notable story is related to the origin myth of the lake itself, while another recounts a love story between the female Seri Gumum and a male Nāga called Seri Kemboja that leads to the origin myth of Tioman and Lingga Islands.

== Origin myth of Chini Lake ==
The most famous legends of Seri Gumum tell of a Jakun tribe who came to occupy the area where the lake is now. They were clearing the forest and making holes in the ground to plant crops. Suddenly, out of the forest came an old lady leaning on a walking stick, admonishing them for the fact that they didn't seek the permission of the spirits. She finally relented after the people apologized and later planted her walking stick in the middle of the field to mark her territory, warning the group not to remove the stick.

Some time later, a dog began to bark endlessly at a rotting log on the edge of the clearing. One of the men threw his dibble stick at the log. Blood spurted out. As other men also began throwing more dibble sticks at the log, blood was gushing out and flowing away across the ground. Suddenly, the sky was split with lightning, and thunder began to roll. The skies let loose a downpour of rain and everyone ran for cover. In the turmoil, the old woman's walking stick was knocked out of the ground. Immediately, a fountain of water poured from the hole made by the stick. The water flowed for many years, thereby creating the Chini Lake. The tribe realized then that the log was actually a Nāga called ‘Seri Gumum’.

== A love tale ==
In another version of the legend, the Seri Gumum was a princess who was sealed away in a Forbidden Garden built on the Lake. Many years later, a foreign prince called 'Putera Kemboja' arrived from afar and both fell in love. The princess eventually broke the seal containing her when she agreed to leave with the prince. As soon as they crossed the boundaries of the Forbidden Garden, Seri Gumum and Seri Kemboja immediately transformed into two Nāga. At that very moment, the Forbidden Garden was flooded, hidden forever at the bottom of Chini Lake.

On dark nights, when the Pahang River was in flood, both Nāga would come out of the lake and go downstream. Villagers would hear thunder and lightning as they passed. One day, as the Nāga were swimming out into the South China Sea, Seri Gumum realized that she had forgotten her sash, so she swam back to the lake to get it. Seri Kemboja, who was stronger and loved his new form, swam all the way to the open sea, thinking that Seri Gumum was trailing behind. Unfortunately, the lady Nāga swam too close to an island called Bukit Dato' and her sash got caught on a stone. While she was trying to get free, she heard the cock crow. She knew it was almost daylight and she could not go farther. She waited for a long time until her breath became so still that she slowly turned into an island. A little bird, the tiom, loved to rest on the island, and soon, the new island was called Tioman. Seri Kemboja, who had swum on ahead, also heard the cock crow. He immediately stopped too and became Lingga Island.

== Sightings ==
Over the decades, there have been occasional reports of sightings, but as in the case of the Loch Ness Monster, these have never been scientifically proven. It was related that the ruler of Pahang would dream of the Nāga whenever there was going to be a big flood that particular year. The native Jakun tribes still held the belief that the lake is the dwelling of a Nāga. Explorer Stewart Wavell visited Chini Lake in the 1960s, and was told of the ancient practice of human sacrifice to the Nāga around a great pillar of rock that rose up out of the waters. These were believed to pacify the Nāga. One of his guides, Che Yang, told him of a great flood that had come to Pekan a couple of years before. Many people had wondered if the Nāga was demanding sacrifice, even though the practice had been stopped generations ago. One day a girl out washing her clothes fell from her raft and was drowned. It was noticed that the waters immediately receded. The townsfolk believed the Nāga was now satisfied, having taken its victim.

In May 1959, a British Engineer Arthur Potter, his clerk Baharuddin and two labourers named Lajan and Malik, all claimed to have seen a dragon-like creature at the lake. The sighting earned Mr. Potter the nickname 'Dragonwick'.

== See also ==
- Nāga
- Loch Ness Monster

== Bibliography ==
- Aripin Said (1985), Juara yang tewas, Dewan Bahasa dan Pustaka, ISBN 978-9836201423
- MacDonald, Margaret Read (2008), The Singing Top: Tales from Malaysia, Singapore, and Brunei, Libraries Unlimited, ISBN 978-1591585053
- Ninotaziz (2012), N A G a: A Legend of Tasik Chini, Xlibris, ISBN 978-1477129234
- Ninotaziz (2015), Nik and the Secrets of the Sunset Ship, MPH Publishing, ISBN 978-9674153144
- Freeman, Richard (2019), Adventures in Cryptozoology: Hunting for Yetis, Mongolian Deathworms and Other Not-So-Mythical Monsters, Mango, ISBN 978-1642500158
