= Sri Bhadravarman =

Ruler of the Old Pahang Kingdom in the 300s CE

Sri Bhadravarman was a Malay ruler of the medieval kingdom of Pahang who reigned in the middle of the 4th century CE. His name was described in the Book of Song as She-li Po-luo-ba-mo (舍利婆羅跋摩), the king of Panhuang or Pohuang (婆皇), who sent an envoy to the Liu Song court in 449-450 with forty one types of products. In 456-457, another envoy of the same country, led by a Senapati, arrived at the Chinese capital, Jiankang with tributes.
