= Lipis River =

River in Pahang, Malaysia

- Native name: Sungai Lipis (Malay)

Location
- Country: Malaysia
- State: Pahang

Physical characteristics
- Source: Titiwangsa Mountains
  - location: Near Tersang, Raub District
- Mouth: Jelai River
  - location: Kuala Lipis, Lipis District

Basin features
- Progression: Jelai > Pahang > South China Sea

Lipis River (Malay: Sungai Lipis) is a river of Pahang, Malaysia.

== See also ==
- List of rivers of Malaysia
