= Labi-labi (dance) =

Malay traditional dance

Labi-labi dance
- Native name: Tarian Labi-labi
- Origin: Malaysia

Labi-labi dance is a traditional dance of Pahang inspired by the community's observation of labi-labi living in rivers, lakes, and ponds. It starts with the event of anglers who want to fish but are lured by labi-labi. Although the anglers were disappointed, the community made the event as a joke and the labi-labi dance movement broke out.

The earliest Labi-labi dance was detected and originated in Kampung Sarang Tiong, Endau, Kuala Rompin, Pahang. This dance has been danced since the 1950s. The Labi-labi dance in Kampung Sarang Tiong is inspired and developed by individuals who are skilled in martial arts. This dance was in its heyday in the 1950s to 1960s. The main purpose of the Labi-labi dance in Kampung Sarang Tiong was created as entertainment. So the dance moves and facial expressions of the dancers are adapted to add an element of funny entertainment that can attract the audience to laugh with funny and entertaining humorous actions.

There are three versions of the origin of Labi-labi dance in Pahang based on the location of this dance. Labi-labi dance in Kampung Sarang Tiong was inspired by the incident of a wife (Ms. Siti) who craved to eat labi-labi, but Ms. Siti's husband could not fulfill the request because he could not catch the labi-labi for the wife. One night, the wife dreamed of being approached by an old man dressed in all white. In his dream, the old man had given instructions on how to catch the labi-labi. The tip is given, anglers only need to prepare banana bait as it is a favorite food of labi-labi. The dream was conveyed by the wife to her husband. After the couple's event, labi-labi became a hot topic of discussion in the village and was inspired to realize a form of dance from the movement of labi-labi that can attract the attention of the people with a funny and very touching performance. It is to celebrate the success of Ms. Siti's husband in catching labi-labi.

The Labi-Labi Dance in Kampung Pulau Rumput, Pekan, Pahang was brought by Encik Iderus bin Ginuh from Kampung Alai, Rompin to Pekan, Pahang in 1964 after he established a household and settled there.

While the Labi-Labi Dance in Kampung Jambu, Pekan is based on the experience of a fisherman named Pak Ngah Hitam in Endau, Kuala Rompin who was stunned by the movement of labi-labi who wanted to eat the bait. Because he was attracted to the movement of the labi-labi, he imitated the action of labi-labi. The Labi-Labi dance in Kampung Jambu at the initial stage was danced by a man who enriched the dance resembling the movement of the labi-labi movement and had nothing to do with the martial arts movement.

== See also ==
- Malay dance
