= Rodat (dance) =

Malay and Acehnese traditional dance

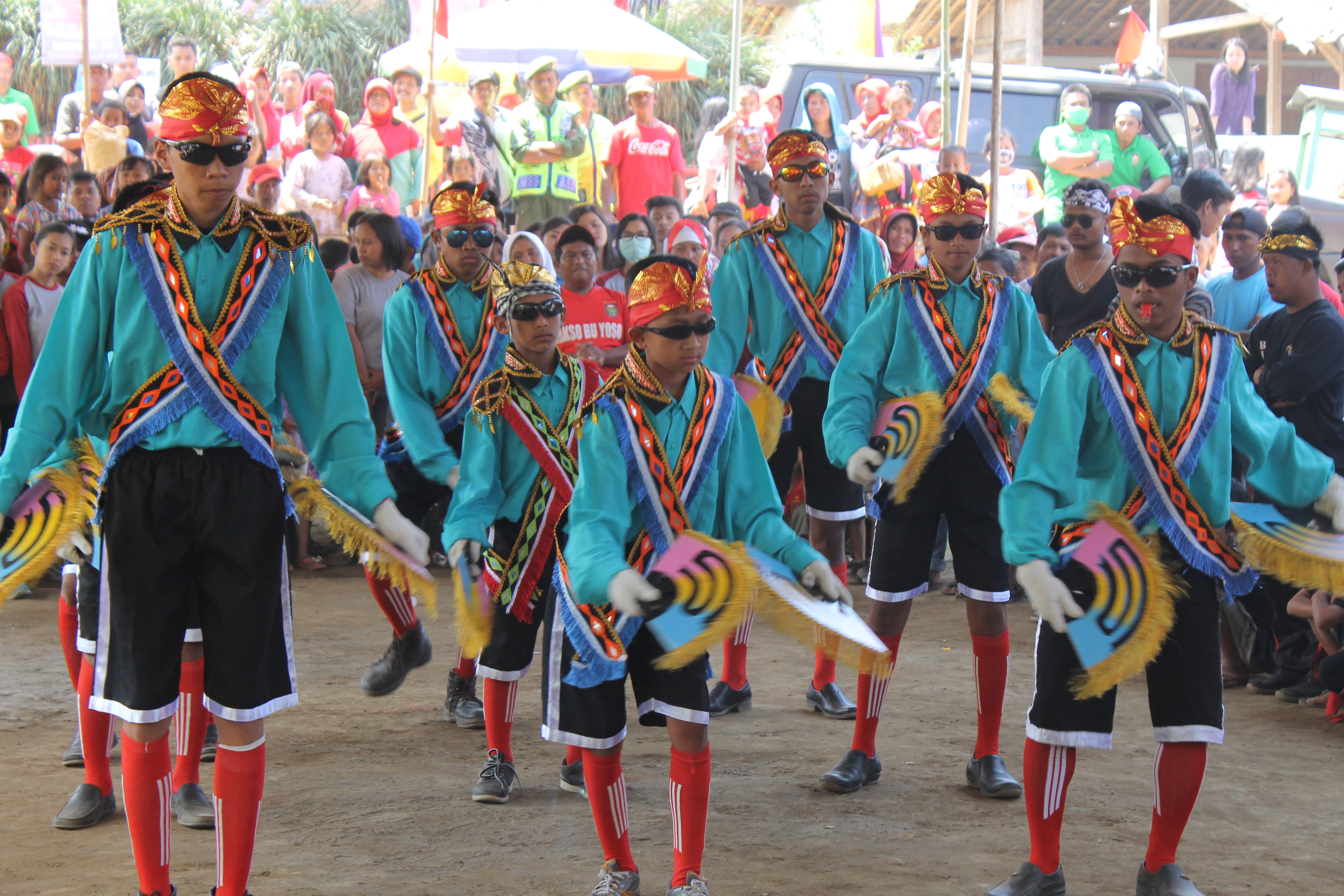
- Rodat dance in Java, Indonesia
- Native name: Tari Rodat (تاري رودت)
- Etymology: From Arabic حضرة (ḥaḍrat)
- Genre: Traditional dance
- Instrument(s): Rebana, Kendhang, Gong
- Inventor: Acehnese, Terengganu Malays
- Origin: Aceh and Terengganu

Rodat (Jawi: رودت) is a folk dance of the Malays and Acehnese believed to have originated from the Middle East and was spread to Maritime Southeast Asia by traders in Aceh as far as Terengganu in the beginning of the 19th century. Rodat may have come from كِتَاب حَضْرَة (Kitāb Ḥaḍrat), which is a book written by a man named Hadrat from Baghdad containing praises to Allah and Muhammad.

== Performance ==
Until the 1900s, Rodat was performed in all male groups with the original style of singing zikir with rebana accompaniment to celebrate Muhammad’s birthday and Malay weddings. However, by 1930, the dancing part was included and performed by transvestite dancers, who were later replaced by women dancers after World War II. With the addition of dancing and singing of popular Malay and Hindustani tunes and female dancers, the performance became popular at secular events such as the harvest celebration, Sultan’s birthday, and festivities for Malaysian National Day.

The performance involves the singing of religious praises, advices, customs, contemplation and awareness, corresponding between the male and female groups of chorus members, and is accompanied by the rhythmic patterns of the rebana drum. The number of performers ranges from 20 to 26 and consisted of three separate group of performers: pelenggok (12 male dancers), pengadi (eight drummers) and mak inang (four to six female dancers). The basic dance movements are divided into sitting-kneeling, a combination of squatting and standing (performed mainly by male dancers) and standing movements.

== Lyrics ==
There are various versions, some extracting 8 to 12 verses from the Kitab Zikir book, while the most notable ones are taken from Kitab Hadrat, which compiles adhkār written by a man named Hadrat who was sentenced to death, and read these words to the king to convince him to lift the sentence.

The most prominent version is called "Ya Hayyu Ya Qayyum," which extracted a few verses from Kitab Hadrat. However, as time went on, these verses went on to be corrupted to a point where not only the pronunciations are incorrect, but many other gibberish sounds were added to the lines. Despite the corruption, the version remains to be the most mainstream version being used in many modern songs including Uji Rashid's Inang Rodat and in the opening performance for the XVI Commonwealth Games in Kuala Lumpur.

Original verse in Arabic

يا حي يا قيوم
احي القلوب تحيا
اصلح لنا الأعمال
في الدين والدنيا

Romanised transliteration

yā ḥayyu yā qayyūm
iḥyīl-qulūba taḥyā
iṣliḥ lanāl-ʾaʿmāla
fīd-dīni wad-dunyā

English translation

O' Ever-Living, o' Sustainer of All Existence
Revive the hearts, that they may live
Rectify for us our actions
In matters of religion and the world

Corrupted version

Ya muyahayo, li muya lanakayo
Amali yahaye, Allah kolo labetaya
Le asalelana, le ala lana de ama
Bi duniwa, Allah niwa la dunia

== See also ==
- Saman (dance)
- Islam in Indonesia
- Islam in Malaysia
- Islam Nusantara
