= Old Pahang kingdom =

Former kingdom in Pahang, Malaysia

Mueang Pahang Pahang Tua
- 449–1454
- Capital: Inderapura
- Common languages: Malayic, Old Malay
- Religion: Mahayana Buddhism
- Government: Monarchy
- Maharaja
  - 449–?: Sri Bhadravarman
  - ?–1454: Dewa Sura (last)
- History
  - First diplomatic mission to China: 449
  - Second diplomatic mission to China: 456
  - Melakan invasion: 1454
| Succeeded by |
| Pahang Sultanate; Kingdom of Singapura |
- Today part of: Malaysia; Singapore

The old Pahang kingdom (Malay: Kerajaan Pahang Tua) was a historical Malay polity centred in the Pahang region on the east coast of the Malay Peninsula. The polity appeared in foreign records from as early as the 5th century and at its height, covered much of modern state of Pahang and the entire southern part of the peninsula. Throughout its pre-Melakan history, Pahang was established as a mueang or naksat of some major regional Malayic mandalas including Langkasuka, Srivijaya and Ligor. Around the middle of the 15th century, it was brought into the orbit of Melaka Sultanate and subsequently established as a vassal Muslim Sultanate in 1470, following the coronation of the grandson of the former Maharaja as the first Sultan of Pahang.

== Names ==
The naming of Pahang relates to the ancient practice in Malayic culture of defining territorial definitions and apportioning lands by water-sheds. The term 'Pahang' in reference to the kingdom, is thought to originate from the name of the Pahang River. There have been many theories on the origin of the name. According to Malay legend, across the river at Kampung Kemahang where the present stream of the Pahang parts with the Pahang Tua, in ancient times stretched a huge mahang tree (macaranga) from which the river and kingdom derived their name. This legend lines up with oral tradition among the Proto-Malay Jakun people that say their forefathers called the country Mahang.

Another notable theory was supported by William Linehan, that relates the early foundation of the kingdom to the settlers from the ancient Khmer civilisation, and claims its name originates from the word saamnbahang (Khmer: សំណប៉ាហាំង) meaning 'tin', based on the discovery of prehistoric tin mines in the state.

There have been many variations of the name Pahang through history. The Book of Song refers to the kingdom as Pohuang or Panhuang. The Chinese chronicler Zhao Rugua knew it as Pong-fong. According to the continuation of Ma Duanlin's Wenxian Tongkao, Pahang was called Siam-lao thasi. By Arabs and Europeans, the kingdom was variously styled Pam, Pan, Paam, Paon, Phaan, Phang, Paham, Pahan, Pahaun, Phaung, Phahangh.

== History ==
=== Prehistory ===
Archaeological evidence shows that humans have inhabited the area that is now Pahang from as early as the Paleolithic Age. Relics have been found at Gunung Senyum that show that a Mesolithic civilisation used Paleolithic implements. Paleolithic artefacts have been discovered At Sungai Lembing, Kuantan, have been discovered without a trace of polishing, which were the remains of a 6,000-year-old civilisation. Traces of Hoabinhian culture is represented by a number of limestone cave sites. Late Neolithic relics are abundant, including polished tools, quoit discs, stone ear pendants, stone bracelets and cross-hatched bark pounders. By around 400 BC, the development of bronze casting led to the flourishing of the Đông Sơn culture, notably for its elaborate bronze war drums.

The early iron civilisation in Pahang that began around the beginning of Common Era is associated by prehistorians with the late Neolithic culture. Relics from this era, found along rivers are particularly numerous in Tembeling Valley, which served as the old main northern highway of communication. Ancient gold workings in Pahang are thought to date back to this early Iron Age as well.

=== Early period ===
The Kra Isthmus region of the Malay Peninsula and its peripheries are recognised by historians as the cradle of Malayic civilisations. Primordial Malayic kingdoms are described as tributaries to Funan by 2nd century Chinese sources.

Ancient settlements can be traced from the Tembeling to as far south as Merchang. Their tracks can also be found in deep hinterland of Jelai, along the Chini Lake, and up to the head-waters of the Rompin. A polity identified as Koli in Geographia or Kiu-Li, centred on the estuary of the Pahang River south of Langkasuka, flourished in the 3rd century. It possessed an important international port, where many foreign ships stopped to barter and resupply. In common with most of the states in the Malay Peninsula during that time, Kiu-Li was in contact with Funan. Chinese records mention that an embassy sent to Funan by the Indian king Murunda sailed from Kiu-Li's port (between 240 and 245 CE). Murunda presented to the Funanese king Fan Chang four horses from the Yuezhi (Kushan) stud farms.

By the middle of the 5th century, another polity suggested to be ancient Pahang, was described in the Book of Song as Pohuang or Panhuang (婆皇). The king of Pohuang, She-li- Po-luo-ba-mo ('Sri Bhadravarman') was recorded to have sent an envoy to the Liu Song court in 449–450 with forty-one types of products. In 456–457, another envoy of the same country, led by a Senapati, arrived at the Chinese capital, Jiankang. This ancient Pahang is believed to have been established later as a mueang to the mandala of Langkasuka–Kedah centred in the modern-day Patani region that rose to prominence with the regression of Funan from the 6th century. The Langkasuka-Kedah with its city states that controlled both coastal fronts of Malay Peninsula, assumed importance in the trading network involving Rome, India and China. The growth in trade brought in foreign influence throughout these city states. The discovery of many Buddhist votive tablets and Hindu icons points toward strong Indian influence during this period.

By the beginning of the 8th century, Langkasuka-Kedah came under the military and political hegemony of Srivijaya. However, the gradual domination of Langkasuka-Kedah was not achieved by conventional warfare, and no records of major seaborne naval expeditions exist. The submission of Langkasuka-Kedah to the might of Srivijaya was of benefit and interest to the former for, as a commercial centre, it was useful to be allied to a powerful polity with a navy strong enough to protect them.

=== Classical period ===
In the centuries that followed, up to the final decline of Srivijaya, Langkasuka-Kedah was one of its closest allies and Kedah rose to become a principal port and even the seat of the Srivijayan Maharaja. Langkasuka-Kedah's fortune were, therefore intertwined with Srivijaya's, and the former's decline only came after the fall of the latter to Chola raids from South India in the 11th century. The power vacuum left by the collapse of Srivijaya was filled by the rise of the Nakhon Si Thammarat kingdom, commonly known in Malay tradition as 'Ligor'. By the 13th century, the kingdom succeeded to incorporate most of the Malay Peninsula including Pahang under its mandala. During this period, Pahang, designated as Muaeng Pahang was established as one of the twelve naksat city states of Ligor. In the early 14th century, the fortune of Ligor was eclipsed by the increase in power of the Thai Sukhothai kingdom and the expansion southwards by its king, Ram Khamhaeng who brought it under Thai hegemony.

The 14th century was the time of the earliest recorded evidence of Islam in the east coast of Malay Peninsula. The period also coincides with Pahang, beginning to consolidate its influence in the southern part of the Malay Peninsula. The kingdom, described by Portuguese historian, Manuel Godinho de Erédia as Pam, was one of the two kingdoms of Malayos in the peninsula, in succession to Pattani, that flourished before the establishment of Melaka in the 15th century. The ruler of Pahang, titled Maharaja, was also the overlord of countries of Ujong Tanah ('land's end') which were the southern parts of the peninsula including Temasek. The Majapahit chronicle, Nagarakretagama even used the name Pahang to designate the Malay Peninsula, an indication of the importance of this kingdom.

The History of Ming records several envoy missions from Pahang to the Ming court in the 14th and 15th centuries. In 1378, Maharaja Tajau sent envoys with a letter on a gold leaf and bringing as tribute six foreign slaves and products of the country. In 1411, during the reign of Maharaja Pa-la-mi-so-la-ta-lo-si-ni (transliterated by historian as 'Parameswara Teluk Chini'), he also sent envoys carrying tributes. The Chinese returned the favour in 1412 by sending Admiral Zheng He as an envoy to Pahang, and in 1414, Pahang sent tribute to China again. In 1416, they sent tribute together with Kozhikode and Java envoys, and in return Zheng He was again ordered to go to Pahang.

=== Melakan invasion ===
The 15th century witnessed the rise of Melaka Sultanate, which under the Sang Sapurba dynasty had aggressively consolidated its influence on the west coast of Malay Peninsula. Earlier, at the end of the 13th century, the dynasty wrested the small trading outpost at Temasek from Pahang influence and established the short-lived kingdom of Singapura which was sacked by the Javanese a century later. The last king of Singapura, Iskandar Shah established Melaka to succeed Singapura.

Muzaffar Shah, the fifth sultan of Melaka, who reigned from 1445 to 1458, refused to acknowledge the suzerainty of Ligor over his country. The Ligorians, in assertion of their claim, sent an invading army led by Awi Chakri, overland to Melaka. The invaders, who were aided by Pahang auxiliaries, followed the old route by the Tembeling, Pahang and Bera rivers. They were easily defeated and fled back by the same route. Subsequently, they attempted a naval invasion, but were again defeated. Muzaffar Shah then conceived the idea of checking Ligorian pretensions by attacking the Ligor vassal state of Pahang. An expedition was organised by Muzaffar's son, Raja Abdullah and was personally led by the Melakan Bendahara Tun Perak with two hundred sail, big and small, accordingly proceeded to Pahang and conquered it in 1454. The reigning ruler of Pahang, Maharaja Dewa Sura, fled to the interior while his daughter Putri Wanang Seri was captured. The victors, anxious to gain the goodwill of the Bendahara, hastened in pursuit of the fugitive king until he was captured and carried together with his daughter to Melaka.

In the year that Pahang was conquered, Raja Abdullah married Putri Wanang Seri, the daughter of the captive king, whose name had been changed, probably on conversion to Islam, to Putri Lela Wangsa. By her he had two sons Raja Ahmad and Raja Muhammad.

== Administration ==
Little is known on the administrative system used in Pahang, but throughout its history, several government titles are recorded. The government was headed by a maharaja (literally 'emperor') as an absolute monarch, a similar title held by its overlord in Ligor. Towards the end of the kingdom, the maharaja was recorded by de Erédia as belonging to the same dynasty that ruled Ligor. A title known as Senapati was recorded in the Book of Song, a Sanskrit word literally means 'lord of the army'. The Senapati was recorded in the Chinese chronicle to have headed several envoy missions to China. Other than that, a Pahang Shahbandar was known to have ruled Temasek before the island was wrested from Pahang by the Sang Sapurba dynasty. The word Shahbandar is a title adopted from Persian that literally means 'lord of the port'.

The old court name was Inderapura, and the capital has always been known as 'the town'. The pre-Melakans calling it by Sanskrit name Pura, the Malays 'Pekan', the Portuguese 'a Cidade', while the people of Rompin and Bebar described the capital as Pekan Pahang. Pura may have covered a much larger than the town known as Pekan today. In addition to modern Pekan, it appears to have comprised the land on the banks of Pahang river as far as Tanjung Langgar.

== Culture ==
The culture of ancient Pahang was the result of the amalgamation of various Mon-Khmer and Malayic cultures. The pre-Melakan inhabitants of the country, together with people of Isthmus region's civilisation further north, were collectively referred as 'Siamese' in the Malay Annals of the Melaka Sultanate, although they were identified culturally as Malays by Portuguese historian de Erédia. On the other hand, de Erédia adopted the term 'Siam' and applied it in a broader context, referring to the overlord of these historical 'Siamese' people, that is the Thai kingdom of Ayuthaya. This broad Portuguese application of the term was later popularised as an exonym for successive Thai kingdoms by other European writers.

In the classical Malay text Hikayat Hang Tuah, it was noted that although the Pahang people regarded themselves as Malays, they spoke and sang their folk songs in a language that differs from the Malay language spoken in Melaka, which would indicate a mixture of tongues and races. The pre-Melakan Pahang people were also described by Fei Xin as the adherents of Mahayana Buddhism, on which tantric orgies involving human sacrifices were superimposed. Its influence in Pahang, though it waned with the introduction of Islam, may be traced up to the beginning of the 17th century.

== Economy ==
The most important product of ancient Pahang was gold. Its gold mines were considered the best and the largest in the whole peninsula. The gold that come from here was traded with Alexandria. The peninsula as a whole was known to the world as a source of the precious metal to the extent that it was proclaimed Chrysḗ Chersónēsos (the golden peninsula) by Ptolemy. According to Fei Xin, Pahang also produced rice, salt which was made by boiling the sea water, and wine by fermenting the sap of the coconut tree. Fei Xin also mentioned on rare and valuable forest products like camphor barus, olibanum, agarwood, sandalwood, sapanwood, pepper and many others. Pahang, in turn, imported silver, coloured silk, Java cloth, copper and ironware, gongs and boards.

== Bibliography ==
- Ahmad Sarji Abdul Hamid (2011), The Encyclopedia of Malaysia, vol. 16 - The Rulers of Malaysia, Editions Didier Millet, ISBN 978-981-3018-54-9
- Andaya, Barbara Watson; Andaya, Leonard Yuzon (1984), A History of Malaysia, London: Palgrave Macmillan, ISBN 978-0-312-38121-9
- Barnard, Timothy P. (2004), Contesting Malayness: Malay identity across boundaries, Singapore: Singapore University press, ISBN 9971-69-279-1
- Benjamin, Geoffrey, Issues in the Ethnohistory of Pahang, Lembaga Muzium Negeri Pahang (Museum Authority of Pahang)
- Collins, James Thomas (1989), "Malay Dialect Research in Malaysia: The Issue of Perspective" (PDF), Bijdragen tot de Taal-, Land- en Volkenkunde, 145 (2): 235–264, doi:10.1163/22134379-90003253
- Guy, John (2014), Lost Kingdoms: Hindu-Buddhist Sculpture of Early Southeast Asia, Metropolitan Museum of Art, ISBN 978-0300-204-37-7
- Hood Salleh (2011), The Encyclopedia of Malaysia, vol. 12 - Peoples and Traditions, Editions Didier Millet, ISBN 978-981-3018-53-2
- Jacq-Hergoualc'h, Michel (2002). The Malay Peninsula: Crossroads of the Maritime Silk-Road (100 Bc-1300 Ad). BRILL. ISBN 90-04-11973-6.
- Khoo, Gilbert (1980), From Pre-Malaccan period to present day, New Straits Times
- Linehan, William (1973), History of Pahang, Malaysian Branch of the Royal Asiatic Society, Kuala Lumpur, ISBN 978-0710-101-37-2
- Milner, Anthony (2010), The Malays (The Peoples of South-East Asia and the Pacific), Wiley-Blackwell, ISBN 978-1444-339-03-1
- Mishra, Patit Paban (2010), The History of Thailand, Greenwood, ISBN 978-0313-340-91-8
- Munoz, Paul Michel (2007), Early Kingdoms of The Indonesian Archipelago and the Malay Peninsula, Didier Millet, ISBN 978-9814155670
- Noor, Farish A. (2011), From Inderapura to Darul Makmur, A Deconstructive History of Pahang, Silverfish Books, ISBN 978-983-3221-30-1
- Rajani, Chand Chirayu (1987), Towards a history of Laem Thong and Sri Vijaya (Asian studies monographs), Institute of Asian Studies, Chulalongkorn University, ISBN 978-9745-675-01-8
- Zakiah Hanum (1989), Asal-usul negeri-negeri di Malaysia (The Origin of States in Malaysia), Times Books International, ISBN 978-9971-654-67-2
