= Ulek mayang =

Traditional dance in Malaysia

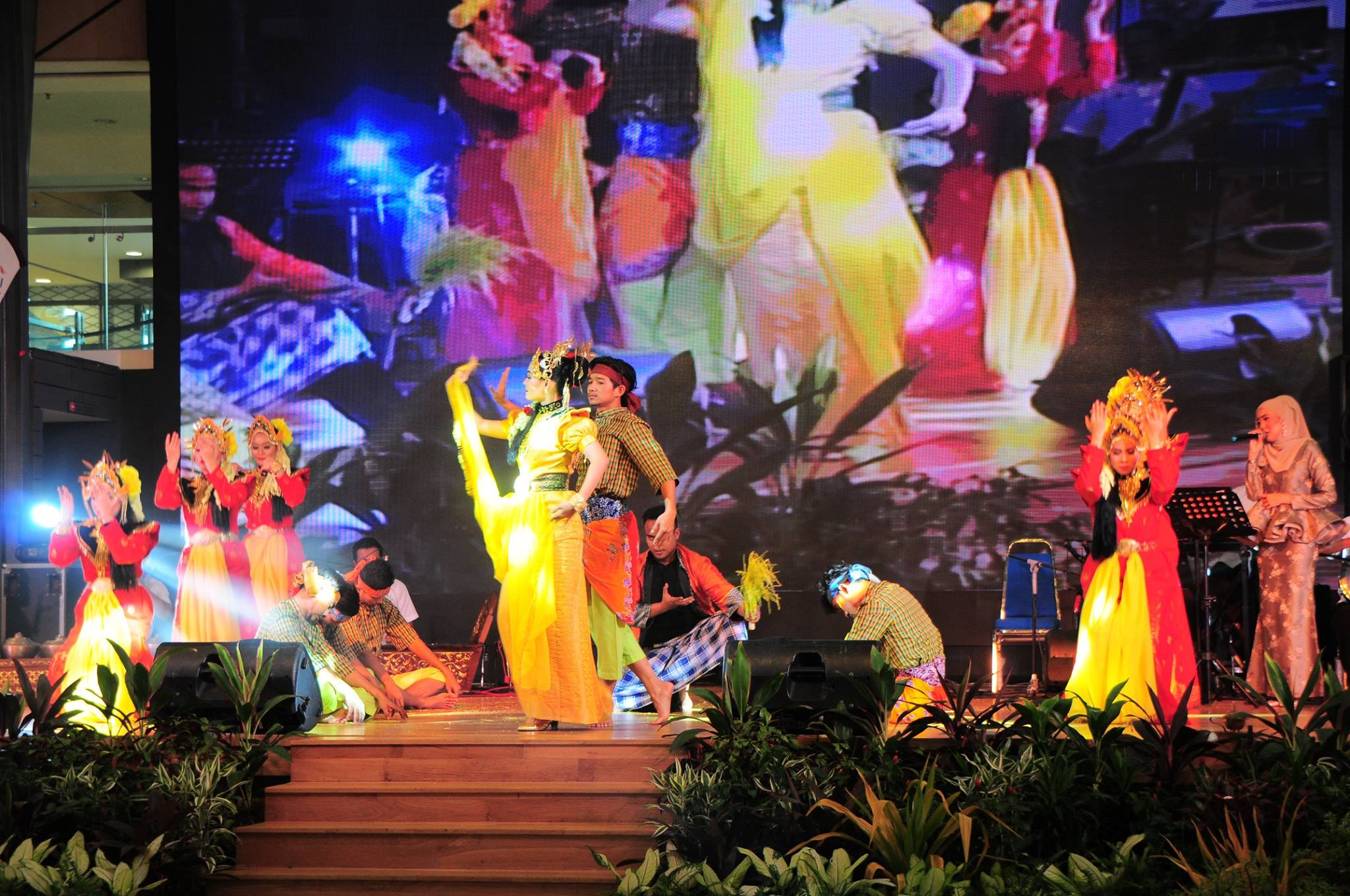
Ulek Mayang performers

Ulek mayang (Jawi: اولق مايڠ) is a classical Malay dance from the state of Terengganu in Malaysia. It is a ritualistic dance performed to appease or invoke the spirits of the sea and is always accompanied by a unique song also called Ulek Mayang. An orchestra comprising drums, gong, violin and accordion accompanies the dance.

== History ==
The ulek mayang is said to have its origin in an ancient tale about a sea-princess who fell in love with a fisherman. The princess abducted the fisherman's soul, leaving his body unconscious. His friends entreated a bomoh (shaman) to heal him. When the bomoh conducted the healing ritual to bring the fisherman's soul back, the princess appeared and responded by calling on five of her sisters to her aid. The battle between the bomoh and the six princesses continued until the prettiest seventh and the eldest princess appeared and put an end to it.

"I know your origins,” says the eldest princess, and she commands everyone, "Let those from the sea return to the sea, and those from the land return to the land."

The grateful bomoh and the fisherman's friends present the princess with coloured rice as an offering to the spirits of the sea. This practice, along with the ulek mayang dance, continued until the Islamization movement of recent decades.

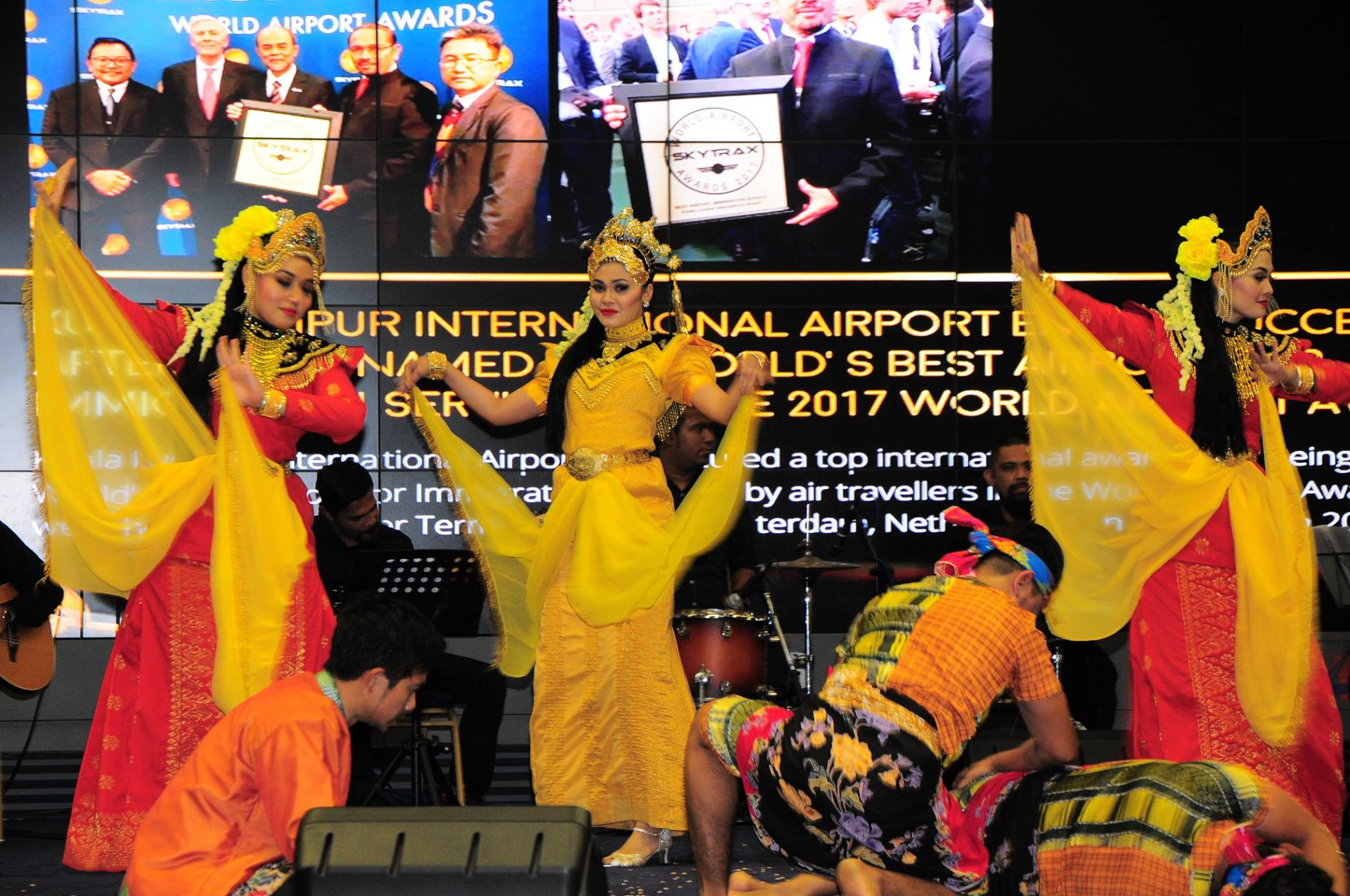
Ulek mayang dancers

== Costume ==
The costume of ulek mayang dancers has two type of clothes, six of the seven female dancers will typically wear a traditional dress such as a long sleeve songket (a silk material) blouse, selendang (a long scarf) that wore in the waist and finger, sanggol (a hairknot), subang (an earring) and long songket skirt in the lower body with others accessories. The main character of the dancer that plays as a Tuan Puteri Mayang Sari (Her Highness The Princess Mayang Sari) or Puteri Tujuh (7th Princess) will wear the same dress and accessories like the six others dancers but the difference is she will wear the short sleeves songket blouse and a different color for her dress. She will usually wear the yellow dress. This is to illustrate that she is the main princess of the dancer. The male performers will wear the fisherman clothes and a bomoh (shaman) will wear the traditional Malay male shirt like Baju Melayu (a long sleeves Malay male shirt).

== Lyrics ==
The Ulek Mayang song which accompanies the dance narrates the story. Tradition holds that the song is supernatural in nature because it gives chills, especially when performed at sunset by the beach. However, the song remains popular and there are numerous contemporary renditions of it. Malaysian rock diva, Ella recorded a rock version, while the thrash metal band Cromok produced several instrumental versions of the song. The song maintains some of the traditional Terengganu pronunciation. Note that mayang is a coconut-palm blossom used to chase away spirits.

Jawi script

اوليق مايڠ کواوليق
اوليق دڠن جالا جيملا
اوليق مايڠ دأوليق
اوليق دڠن توانڽ ڤوتري
اوليق مايڠ دأوليق
اوليق دڠن جالا جيملا
اوليق مايڠ دأوليق
اوليق دڠن ڤوتريڽ دوا

ڤوتري دوا برباجو سيروڠ
ڤوتري دوا برسڠݢول سينديڠ
ڤوتري دوا برسوبڠ ݢاديڠ
ڤوتري دوا برسليندڠ کونيڠ
اومبوق مايڠ دأومبوق
اومبوق دڠن جالا جيملا
نوق اوليق مايڠ دأوليق
اوليق دڠن ڤوتريڽ امڤت

ڤوتري امڤت برباجو سيروڠ
ڤوتري امڤت برسڠݢول سينديڠ
ڤوتري امڤت برسوبڠ ݢاديڠ
ڤوتري امڤت برسليندڠ کونيڠ
اومبوق مايڠ دأومبوق
اومبوق دڠن جالا جيملا
نوق اوليق مايڠ دأوليق
اوليق دڠن ڤوتريڽ انم

ڤوتري انم برباجو سيروڠ
ڤوتري انم برسڠݢول سينديڠ
ڤوتري انم برسوبڠ ݢاديڠ
ڤوتري انم برسليندڠ کونيڠ
اومبوق مايڠ دأومبوق
اومبوق دڠن جالا جيملا
نوق اوليق مايڠ دأوليق
اوليق دڠن ڤوتريڽ توجوه

ڤوتري توجوه باجوڽ برلڠن ڤينديق
ڤوتري توجوه برسڠݢول سينديڠ
ڤوتري توجوه برسوبڠ ݢاديڠ
ڤوتري توجوه برسليندڠ کونيڠ
اومبوق مايڠ دأومبوق
اومبوق دڠن جالا جيملا
نوق اوليق مايڠ دأوليق
اوليق دڠن توانڽ ڤوتري

توان ڤوتري برباجو لڠن ڤينديق
توان ڤوتري برسڠݢول سينديڠ
توان ڤوتري برسوبڠ ݢاديڠ
توان ڤوتري برسليندڠ کونيڠ
اومبوق مايڠ دأومبوق
اومبوق دڠن جالا جيملا
نوق اوليق مايڠ دأوليق
اوليق دڠن توانڽ ڤوتري

کوتاهو اصل اصولمو
يڠ لاءوت باليق کلاءوت
يڠ دارت باليق کدارت
ناسي برورنا همبا سمبهکن
اومبوق مايڠ کواومبوق
اومبوق دڠن جالا جيملا
ڤوليه مايڠ کوڤوليه
ڤوليه باليق سديا کالا

Rumi script

Ulek mayang kuulek
Ulek dengan jala jemala
Ulek mayang diulek
Ulek dengan tuannya puteri
Ulek mayang diulek
Ulek dengan jala jemala
Ulek mayang diulek
Ulek dengan puterinya dua

Puteri dua berbaju serong
Puteri dua bersanggol sendeng
Puteri dua bersubang gading
Puteri dua berselendang kuning
Umbok mayang diumbok
Umbok dengan jala jemala
Nok ulek mayang diulek
Ulek dengan puterinya empat

Puteri empat berbaju serong
Puteri empat bersanggol sendeng
Puteri empat bersubang gading
Puteri empat berselendang kuning
Umbok mayang diumbok
Umbok dengan jala jemala
Nok ulek mayang diulek
Ulek dengan puterinya enam

Puteri enam berbaju serong
Puteri enam bersanggol sendeng
Puteri enam bersubang gading
Puteri enam berselendang kuning
Umbok mayang diumbok
Umbok dengan jala jemala
Nok ulek mayang diulek
Ulek dengan puterinya tujuh

Puteri tujuh bajunya berlengan pendek
Puteri tujuh bersanggol sendeng
Puteri tujuh bersubang gading
Puteri tujuh berselendang kuning
Umbok mayang diumbok
Umbok dengan jala jemala
Nok ulek mayang diulek
Ulek dengan tuannya puteri

Tuan puteri berbaju lengan pendek
Tuan puteri bersanggol sendeng
Tuan puteri bersubang gading
Tuan puteri berselendang kuning
Umbok mayang diumbok
Umbok dengan jala jemala
Nok ulek mayang diulek
Ulek dengan tuannya puteri

Kutahu asal usul mu
Yang laut balik ke laut
Yang darat balik ke darat
Nasi berwarna hamba sembahkan
Umbok mayang kuumbok
Umbok dengan jala jemala
Pulih mayang kupulih
Pulih balik sedia kala

Literal English translation

I entreat the mayang
Entreat with shining nets
Entreat the mayang
Singing with her highness the princess
Entreat the mayang
Entreat it with shining nets
Entreat the mayang
Singing together with the second princess

Second princess wears a slanted blouse
Second princess with a slanted hair knot
Second princess wears ivory earrings
Second princess has a yellow scarf
Persuading the mayang
Persuade it with shining nets
Entreating the mayang
Singing with the fourth princess

Fourth princess wears a slanted blouse
Fourth princess with a slanted hairknot
Fourth princess wears ivory earrings
Fourth princess has a yellow scarf on
Persuading the mayang
Persuade it with shining nets
Entreating the mayang
Singing with the sixth princess

Sixth princess wears a slanted blouse
Sixth princess with a slanted hairknot
Sixth princess wears ivory earrings
Sixth princess has a yellow scarf
Persuading the mayang
Persuade it with shining nets
Entreating the mayang
Singing with the seventh princess

Seventh princess wears a short sleeves blouse
Seventh princess with the slanted hairknot
Seventh princess wears ivory earrings
Seventh princess has a yellow scarf
Persuading the mayang
Persuade it with shining nets
Entreating the mayang
Singing with her highness the princess

Her highness the princess wears a short sleeves blouse
Her highness the princess with a slanted hairknot
Her highness the princess wears ivory earrings
Her highness the princess has a yellow scarf
Persuading the mayang
Persuade it with nets
Entreating the mayang
Singing with her highness the princess

I know your origins
Let those from the sea return to the sea
Let those from the land return to the land
I present the coloured rice
I persuade the mayang
Persuade it with shining nets
I heal with mayang
Bringing back to health
