= Inderapura =

Inderapura was the capital city of the medieval kingdom of Pahang that existed from 5th to 15th century. The city was mentioned several times in the Malay Annals in narrating the conquest of Pahang in 1454. The word Inderapura means "Town of Indra" in Sanskrit, Indra being the leader of the Devas and the lord of Svargaloka in Dharmic religions.

Throughout Pahang history, the capital has always been known as 'the town'. The pre-Melakans calling it by the short form Pura, while the Melakans refer it as Pekan ('the town' in Malay language), while the people of Rompin and Bebar traditionally described the capital as Pekan Pahang. Pura may have covered a much larger than the town known as Pekan today. In addition to modern Pekan, it appears to have comprised the land on the banks of Pahang river as far as Tanjung Langgar.

After the conquest of Pahang by Melaka Sultanate in 1454, the city was established as the seat of the Melakan governor, Sri Bija Diraja Tun Hamzah. The governorate however, was short-lived. In 1470, it was transformed into a vassal Sultanate under Sultan Muhammad Shah, the grandson of Dewa Sura, the last Maharaja of Pahang. The Portuguese Malacca that established relation with the Sultanate in the 16th century, called the capital a Cidade ('the town'). By this period, the town's name in Malay language has been commonly known as 'Pekan'.
