= Terengganu Malay =

Austronesian language

- Base Tranung; Bahasa Melayu Terengganu بهاس ترڠݢانو
- Native to: Malaysia
- Region: Terengganu, Mersing and Tanjung Sedili (Johor), Kuantan (Pahang)
- Ethnicity: Terengganuan Malay
- Native speakers: 1.1 million (2010)
- Language family: Austronesian: Malayo-Polynesian; Malayic; Terengganu Malay
- Dialects: Coastal Terengganu; Inland Terengganu
- Writing system: Latin script, Arabic Script (Jawi)

Language codes
- ISO 639-3: –
- Glottolog: tere1283
- Linguasphere: 33-AFA-ca
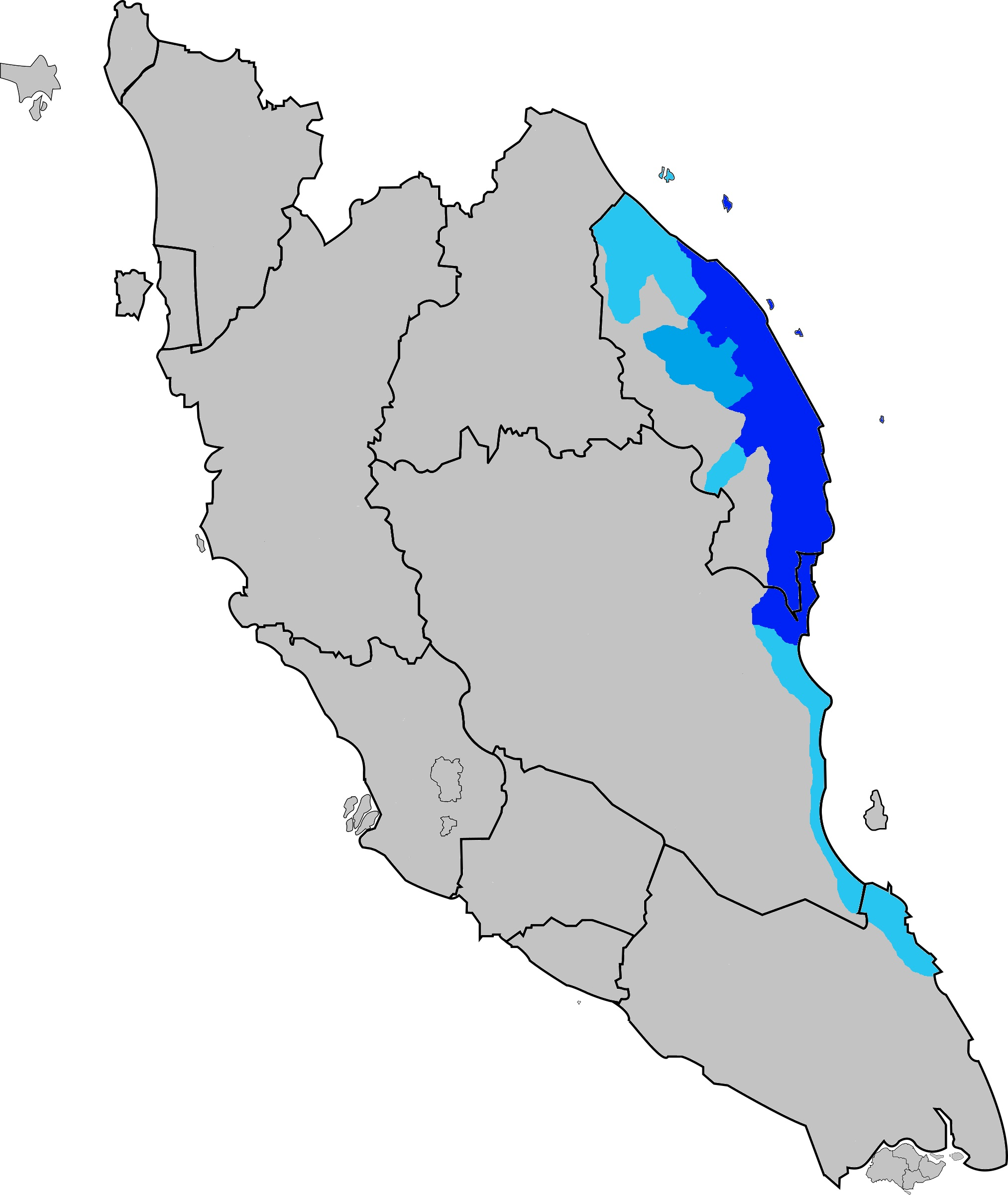
- Areas where Coastal Terengganu Malay is the majority language Areas where Inland Terengganu Malay is the majority language Areas where Terengganu Malay is a minority language

Terengganu Malay (Malay: Bahasa Melayu Terengganu; Terengganu Malay: Bahse Tranung/Ganu) is a Malayic language spoken in the Malaysian state of Terengganu all the way southward to coastal Pahang and northeast Johor. It is the native language of Terengganu Malays and highly localised Chinese Peranakan (locally known as "Mek and Awang") community as well as a second language among the smaller Indian minority.

The language has developed distinct phonetic, syntactic and lexical distinctions which makes it mutually unintelligible for speakers from outside the east coast of Peninsular Malaysia, especially those who speak Standard Malay. Terengganu Malay still shares close linguistic ties with neighboring Kelantan and Pahang of which it forms under the umbrella term East Coast Peninsular Malayic languages but maintain its own features distinct from both of those languages.

Terengganu Malay also coexists with two closely related Malayic varieties. In the districts of Besut and northern part of Setiu, the majority of the population speak a variant of Kelantan-Pattani Malay, but in recent years many people from southern Terengganu started to migrate into these two districts and both variants now coexist with each other. In the inland mukim of Pasir Raja, Dungun, several villages still speak a variant of Ulu Tembeling dialect of Pahang Malay, locally known as Pasir Raja dialect.

Terengganu Malay is considered to be the most recognisable identity of the state. This can be seen in many local television dramas, movies, songs, poems and religious sermons which emphasize the usage of Terengganu Malay. Radio stations in Terengganu whether public (Terengganu FM) or privately owned (Hot FM and Molek FM) mainly use Terengganu Malay in its broadcast alongside standard Malaysian. Recent years show an increase of awareness of the uniqueness of Terengganu Malay, such as the increasing use of Terengganu Malay in shop signs and recently the publication of a Hulu Terengganu Malay dictionary.

== Names ==
The people of Terengganu refer to their language as base/bahse Tranung/Tghanung (/bahsə tɣanuŋ/) which means 'the language of Terengganu' or cakak Tranung (/tʃakaʔ tɣanuŋ/) which means 'Terengganu speech'. In Standard Malay, it is known as bahasa Terengganu or bahasa Melayu Terengganu. Besides Tranung, Tranu, Ganung, Teganung, Teganu and Ganu are also used with the latter (Ganu) being used as an exonym by people outside of Terengganu when referring to Terengganu.

== Distribution ==
Terengganu Malay is natively spoken in most parts of Terengganu other than Besut and the northern part of Setiu. Besides Terengganu, it is also spoken in coastal Pahang, from Cherating near the border with Kemaman district to as far south as Mersing district in the state of Johor. A variety spoken in the village of Tanjung Sedili in the district of Kota Tinggi is said to be a mixture of Terengganuan, Johorean and several other Malay varieties, reflecting the historical demographics of the area, which once received Malay migrants from Terengganu.

== Dialects ==
Terengganu Malay has two major dialects: Coastal (zlm-coa) and Inland (zlm-inl) and each of these two dialects has several regional differences depending on districts or villages. The dialect spoken in Kuala Terengganu district is the de facto standard dialect of Terengganu Malay. The major differences between Coastal (known as Pata) and Inland (known as Ulu) dialects is the pronunciation of the letter "e" of which Coastal Terengganu speakers tend to pronounce it as a schwa while Inland Terengganu speakers pronounce it with strong "e" (as in red).

People in the northernmost regions of Terengganu, specifically in the district of Besut and several parts of Setiu do not speak Terengganu Malay, but instead uses Kelantan-Pattani Malay. The dialects spoken in Dungun, Marang and Kemaman as well as outside of Terengganu such as in Pahang (Kuantan, Pekan and Rompin) and Johor (Mersing) does not have significant differences than those in Kuala Terengganu and is classified as part of the Coastal dialect. The residents of Tanjung Sedili which is a small coastal village in Kota Tinggi, Johor spoke a dialect that is a mixture of Johorean and Terengganuan as the residents there are mostly of Terengganu Malay ancestry.

In Pasir Raja which is a mukim located in the interior parts of Dungun, majority of the Malays there spoke a variant of Pahang Malay specifically the Ulu Tembeling dialect instead of Terengganuan. It is because the majority of the people in those areas are descendants of Pahang migrants that migrated into Dungun more than a hundred years ago. Today both varieties (Pahang Malay and Terengganu Malay) coexists in Pasir Raja and the residents can fluently speak both of those varieties.

Based on 2013 research, the division of Terengganu Malay are as follows

- Terengganu Malay
  - Coastal Terengganu
    - Kuala Nerus-Kuala Terengganu
      - Kedai Buluh
    - Dungun
    - Marang
    - Kemaman-Coastal Pahang-Mersing
      - Kemaman
      - Kuantan
      - Kuala Rompin
      - Mersing
  - Inland Terengganu
    - Kuala Berang
    - Ulu Telemong
    - Jerengau
    - Kuala Jengai
    - Hulu Dungun
    - Hulu Nerus

=== Comparison between Coastal and Inland dialects ===
Inland Terengganu	Coastal Terengganu	English
Ughaong/Ughang	Oghang	People
Kubo	Kuba	Buffalo
Balaik	Balék	Leave
Tubaik	Tubék	Out
Dimi	Déme	You
Mume	Mung	You
Bayak	Kabo	Tell
Ayo	Lebong	Lie

== Literature ==
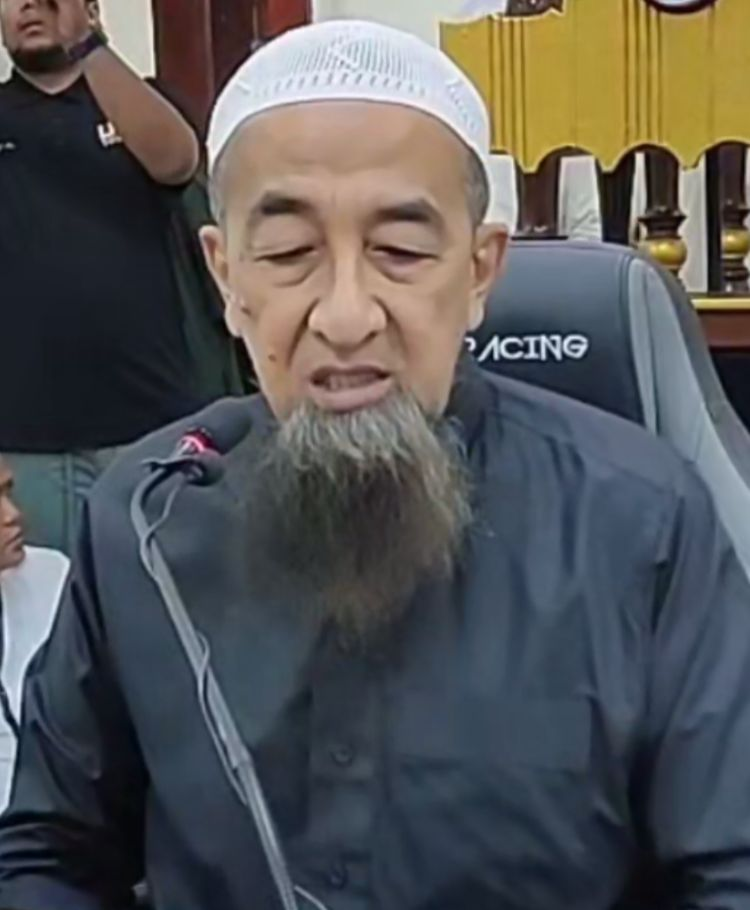
Ustaz Azhar Idrus, a popular religious preacher in Terengganu is often known for his use of Terengganuan during his sermons

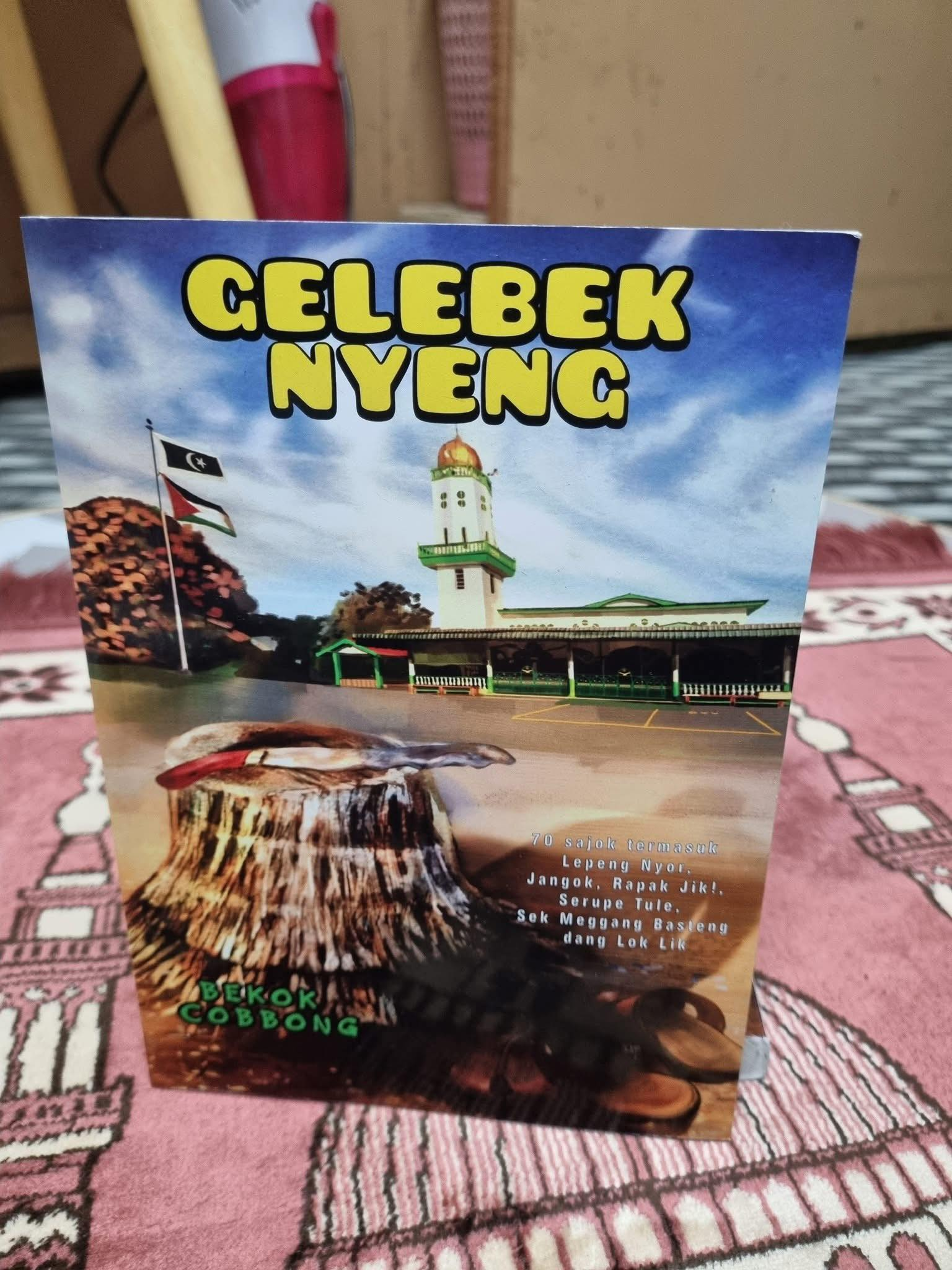
The Book "Gelebek Nyeng" is a book written by author Bekok Cobbong in Terengganuan about traditional Terengganuan poems. Original picture by Kesultanan Terengganu Islamiah Melayuwiah

Although essentially a spoken language with no standard orthography, Terengganu Malay is widely used in folk songs, poems, and also in mainstream and local media (such as local radio stations, dramas and movies). Ibrahim Taib, a famous Terengganu poet was known for his usage of Inland Terengganu dialect in his poems such as "Mok, Aku Nok Tubaik" ('Mom, I want to get out') and "Jadilah Awang" ('Enough Awang').

=== Music ===
Terengganu has a rich history of folk songs sung mostly in Terengganu Malay, among those are Anok Udang, Anok Burung Baniong, Ulek Mayang and Watimang Landok.

Besides traditional folk songs, Terengganu Malay has also made way into modern contemporary songs especially singers or bands who were born and raised in Terengganu. Among the most well known was the song "Blues Tranung/Ganu Kite" by a famous Malaysian band Iklim. It was a hit song not just in Terengganu but also across Malaysia in the 90s and 2000s. "Dondang Dendang", a 1999 song composed by Suhaimi Mohd Zain and recorded by traditional singers Noraniza Idris and Siti Nurhaliza, contains an old Terengganuan Malay poem in the bridge based on the traditional Terengganu dance called Rodat. Another band called Spring also recorded a song sung in Terengganuan, called "Hati Mahu Baik".

== Phonology ==
=== Consonants ===
Consonant inventory of Terengganu Malay

	Labial	Dental	Alveolar	Palatal	Velar	Glottal
Stops	p b	t	d		k ɡ	ʔ
Fricatives			s		x	h
Nasals	m		n	ɲ	ŋ	
Affricates				c j		
Liquids			l		ɣ	
Glides	w					

=== Vowel Inventory ===
	Front	Central	Back
High	i ĩ		u ũ
Mid-High	e		o
Mid-Low	ɛ ɛ̃	ə	ɔ ɔ̃
Low		a ã	

=== Pronunciation ===
/a/ followed by a nasal consonant changes to /ŋ/: ayam ايم ('chicken') becomes ayang; makan ماكن ('to eat') becomes makang

/a/ at the end of syllables changes to /ɔʔ/: minta مينتا ('to ask') becomes mitok

/ah/ changes to /ɔh/: rumah رومه ('house') becomes rumoh

/a/ changes to /ə/: saya ساي ('I') becomes saye

/i/ changes to /iŋ/: sini سيني ('here') becomes sining

/ua/ changes to /ɔ/: buaya بوايا ('crocodile') becomes boye

/aj/ becomes /aː/: sungai سوڠاي ('river') becomes sunga

/aw/ becomes /a/: pisau ڤيساو ('knife') changes to pisa

/ia/ before a nasal vowel changes to /ijaŋ/: siam سيام ('Siam') becomes siyang

/ia/ changes to /ɛ/: biasa بياسا ('once') becomes bese

/s/ and /f/ at the end of syllables changes to /h/: malas مالس ('lazy') changes to malah

/m/ and /n/ at the end of syllables changes to /ŋ/: hakim حاكيم ('judge') changes to hakeng

/r/ changes to /ɣ/: orang اورڠ ('person') becomes oghang

Final consonants are often only pronounced as a glottal stop. bukit بوكيت ('hill') becomes buke’ ([bukiʔ])

Words are distinguished by lengthened initial consonant.

Final /l/ is silent. Example: tinggal ('left') becomes tingga; tebal ('thick') becomes teba.

Usually /l/ as in /lah/ is removed and becomes /ah/. Example: Banyaklah ('so many') becomes banyok ah.

Bulang ('moon') vs. bːulang ('many months'); katok ('to strike') vs. kːatok ('frog'); siku ('elbow') vs. sːiku ('hand tool')

== Vocabulary ==
Several comparisons between Standard Malay and Terengganu Malay with English translations:

Pronouns
Terengganu Malay	Standard Malay	English Translation
Mung/Awok/Demə/Dimɛ/Mikɛ/Uning	Awak/Kamu/Kau	'You' (singular)
Awokmung/Sekmung	Kalian	'You' (plural)
Ambə/Ambɛ/Aku	Saya/Aku	'I'
Sek yə/Awok yə/Demə/Dimɛ	Mereka	'They'
Ye/Nye/Die	Dia	'He/She'
Kitə/Kitɛ/Kaming	Kami	'We' (exclusive)

Question Words
Terengganu Malay	Standard Malay	English Translation
Sape/Ppiye	Siapa/Siapakah	'Who'
Mende/Nde/Nape/Ape/Gape	Apa/Apakah	'What'
Bile	Bila/Bilakah	'When'
Wane/Guane	Bagaimana/Bagaimanakah	'How'
Mane/Ane	Mana	'Where'
Bakpe	Mengapa	'Why'
Wape/Bape/Bghape	Berapa	'How Much'

Basic Words
Terengganu Malay	Standard Malay	English
Brehi/Brahi/Wahi	Suka	Like/interest
Suke/Gelekek	Ketawa	Laugh
Ghetek/Etek/Jugok(often shortened to just gok)	Juga	Also
Gok	Kandang	Cage
Hok	Yang	Conjunction, similar to 'which'.
Kabo/Royak	Beritahu	To tell
Tak Mboh/Amboh	Tidak mahu	Do not want
Tido/Jeretoh	Tidur	Sleep
Babey/Gong/Kerah Keng	Degil	Stubborn
Sokmo	Selalu	Always
Pitih/Yya/Ghiya	Duit/Wang	Money
Dok	Tidak	No
Ho/Ye	Ya	Yes
Ghetok	Jambatan	Bridge
Bekeng	Garang	Pugnacious
Ape Kabo/Guane Gamok	Apa Khabar?	How are you?
Tagak/Igak	Tangkap	Catch
Nyenyeh/Nganjing	Ejek	Insulting
Mmusang	Panas Baran	Hot-tempered
Ghalik	Leka	Preoccupied
Dok ghok	Letih	Tired
Supik/Jabir	Kantung Plastik	Plastic bag
Saing	Kawan	Friend
Dang	Sempat	Make it
Nellang/Tebeng	Berani	Brave
Keghek	Kerap	Many times
Bang	Azan	Adhan (Islamic call to prayer)
Doksoh/Soh Beng	Jangan	Do not
Kupik	Kedekut	Stingy
Lok	Biar	Let
Ce/Tra	Cuba	Try
Lening	Sekarang	Today
Tubek	Keluar	Out
Ping/Peng	Ais/Es	Ice (refers to ice cubes in water)
Letok/Skung	Letak	Put
Tohok	Buang	Throw away
Khabak/Kabak	Panjat	Climb
Lepo/Plekong/Petong	Lempar	Throw
Sapa	Sampai	Arrive
Kekgi	Nanti	Later
Doktong, Liwo-liwo	Berjalan-jalan, Bersiar-siar	Stroll, trip, travel
Cendéng	Gagal	Fail

Intensifier
Standard Malay	Terengganu Malay	English
Sangat Putih	Puteh Lepuk/Sepuk	Very white
Sangat Hitam	Itang Beletung/Belegang	Very dark
Sangat Merah	Meroh Nyale/Merang	Very red
Sangat Kuning	Kuning Sio	Very yellow
Sangat Busuk	Busuk Kohong/Bango/Hapok	Very smelly
Sangat Hancing	Hacing Pering	Very stenchy
Sangat Hanyir	Hanyey Mekok	Very fishy
Sangat Wangi	Wangi Mekok	Very fragrant
Sangat Tengik	Tengik Bango	Very rancid
Sangat Masin	Masing Pekok/Rebing	Very salty
Sangat Manis	Manih Letting	Very sweet
Sangat Tawar	Tawo Hebe	Very tasteless
Sangat Pahit	Pahik Lepang	Very bitter
Sangat Masam	Masang Rebang	Very sour

Numerals
Standard Malay	Terengganu Malay	English
Satu	Se	One
Dua	Duwe	Two
Tiga	Tige	Three
Empat	Pak	Four
Lima	Lime	Five
Enam	Nang	Six
Tujuh	Tujoh	Seven
Lapan	Lapang	Eight
Sembilan	Smilang/Mmilang	Nine
Sepuluh	Spuloh/Ppuloh	Ten
Seratus	Sratoh	One hundred
Seribu	Sribu	One thousand
Sejuta	Sjuta	One million

Animals
Standard Malay	Terengganu Malay	English
Ayam	Ayang	Chicken
Buaya	Boye	Crocodile
Obor-Obor	Apa-Apa	Jellyfish
Ikan Tongkol	Ikang Aye	Euthynnus affinis
Ikan Cencaru	Ikang Kerah Ekor	Torpedo scad
Ikan Pelaga	Ikang Sekila/Skila	Fighting fish
Labah-labah	Llabe	Spider
Lintah	Litoh	Slug
Biawak Air	Bewok Riang	Asian water monitor
Kerbau	Kuba/Kubo (in Inland Terengganu)	Buffalo
Kumbang	Kkabo	Beetle
Semut Merah	Semuk Gata	Fire ant
Ular	Ulo	Snake
Harimau	Rima	Tiger
Singa	Singe	Lion
Lipas	Lipah	Cockroach
Gajah	Ghajoh	Elephant
Burung Helang	Burong Siwoh	Eagle
Biawak	Bewok	Monitor lizard
Tupai	Tupa	Squirrel
Katak	Katok (not to be mistaken with a Terengganuan homonym, which means 'to strike')	Frog
Kelekatu	Katu	Termite alates
Anai-Anai	Ana-Ana	Termite
Sotong	Sutong	Squid
Kura-kura	Kure	Tortoise/Turtle

== Notable Terengganuan phrases ==
Starang baroh means 'really', a popular phrase used to show or express something that is really serious or true.

Example: Ambe dok tau starang baroh, as opposed to Standard Malay or West coast Malay dialects: Saya memang tak tahu langsung.

Another famous Terengganuan Malay phrase is Senyung sokmo which means Senyum selalu in standard Malay and 'Smile always' in English. It is widely used by Terengganu people to wish other people well and to brighten their days.

Dokrok cettong denotes two situations whereby one is totally exhausted or someone who is very weak.

== Sample text ==
Terengganu Malay:

Budok-budok lening koho dok kena makanang tradisi, sohbeng kate kuey, nasik pong ttuko bimbo lagi, nok wak guane makanang lening modeng blake, oghang mude tak mboh belajo duk ngarak ke oghang tue sokmo.

Standard Malay:

Budak-budak sekarang semakin tak kenal makanan tradisi, jangan kata kuih, nasi pun masih tertukar lagi, nak buat macam mana makanan sekarang semua moden, orang muda tak nak belajar selalu mengharap ke orang-orang tua.

English

'Kids today don't know about traditional foods, it's not just traditional cakes, even the rice as well, what can we do all foods these days are modern, younger generations don't want to learn always rely on old people.'
