= Jelai River =

River in Pahang, Malaysia

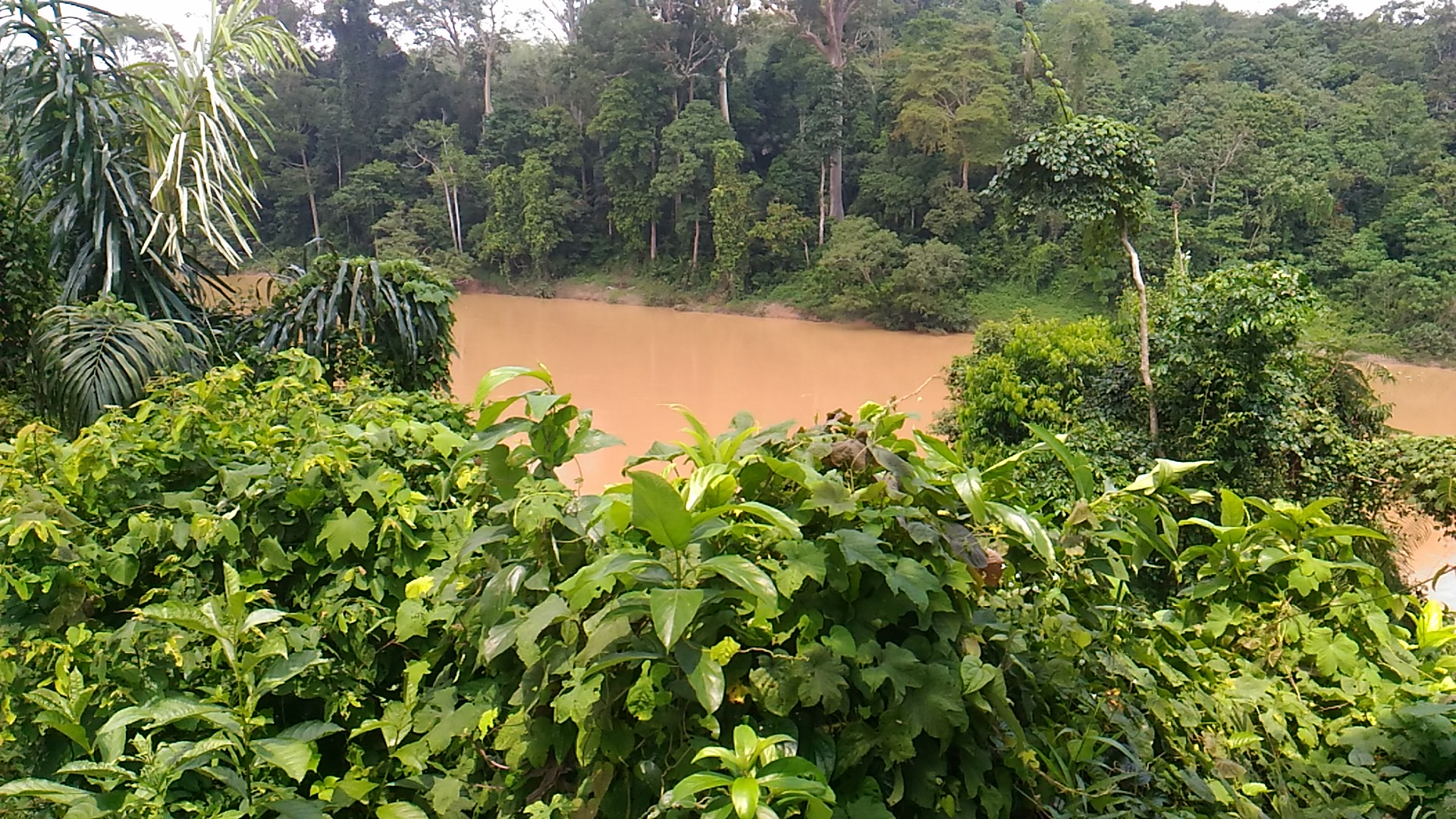
- Native name: Sungai Jelai (Malay)

Location
- Country: Malaysia
- State: Pahang

Physical characteristics
- Source: Titiwangsa Mountains
  - location: Cameron Highlands
- Mouth: Pahang River
  - location: Kuala Tembeling, Jerantut District
  - coordinates: 4°04′13″N 102°18′59″E
- Length: 97.14 km (60.36 mi)

Basin features
- Progression: Pahang > South China Sea

The Jelai River (Malay: Sungai Jelai) is a 97.14 km long river in Pahang, Malaysia. It is one of the two main tributaries of the Pahang River, the longest river in Peninsular Malaysia.

== See also ==
- List of rivers of Malaysia
