= Pahang Kingdom =

Malay state from 1770 to 1881

Pahang Kingdom كرجاءن ڤهڠ Kerajaan Pahang
- 1770–1881
- Flag
- Status: Autonomous kingdom within the Johor Empire (1770–1853)
- Capital: Pekan
- Common languages: Malay, Pahang Malay
- Religion: Sunni Islam
- Government: Monarchy
- Raja bendahara
  - 1770–1802: Tun Abdul Majid (first)
  - 1863–1881: Tun Ahmad (last)
- History
  - Self rule by Tun Abdul Majid: 1770
  - Independence: 1853
  - Civil war: 1857–1863
  - Klang War: 1872–1873
  - Proclamation of Modern Sultanate: 8 September 1881
- Currency: Tampang, native gold and silver coins
Preceded by	Succeeded by
Johor Empire	Pahang
- Today part of: Malaysia

The Pahang Kingdom (Malay: Kerajaan Pahang, Jawi: كرجاءن ڤهڠ) was a Malay state that existed from 1770 to 1881, and is the immediate predecessor of the modern Malaysian state of Pahang. The kingdom came into existence with the consolidation of power by the Bendahara family in Pahang, following the gradual dismemberment of the Johor Empire. Self rule was established in Pahang in the late 18th century, with Tun Abdul Majid declared as the first raja bendahara. The area around Pahang formed a part of the hereditary domains attached to this title and administered directly by the raja bendahara. The weakening of the Johor Sultanate and the disputed succession to the throne was coupled by the increasing independence of the Bendahara in Pahang, the Temenggong in Johor and Singapore, and the Yamtuan Muda in Riau.

In 1853, the fourth raja bendahara Tun Ali, renounced his allegiance to the Sultan of Johor and became the independent ruler of Pahang. He was able to maintain peace and stability during his reign, but his death in 1857 led to a succession dispute. The younger son Wan Ahmad challenged the succession of his half-brother Tun Mutahir, in a dispute that escalated into a civil war. Supported by the neighbouring Terengganu Sultanate and the Siamese, Wan Ahmad emerged victorious, establishing control over important towns and expelling his brother in 1863. He served as the last raja bendahara, and was proclaimed Sultan of Pahang by his chiefs in 1881.

== History ==
=== Founding ===
The consolidation of bendahara rule in the Johor Empire began in the late 17th century. During this period, the bendahara as the highest minister of the empire were able to undermine the sultan's powers. When Mahmud Shah II died in 1699, Bendahara Tun Abdul Jalil became the next Sultan of Johor and assumed the title Abdul Jalil Shah IV. His appointment was accepted by the Johorean chiefs based on the understanding that the bendaharas would succeed to the throne if the sultan died without heirs. Pahang, meanwhile came under the control of Bendahara Tun Mas Enum (1699–1717). He was followed by Bendahara Tun Abdullah (1717), Bendahara Tun Abdul Jamal (1717) and Bendahara Tun Husain (1721–1748).

Tun Hasan ruled Pahang from 1748 to 1770. He was succeeded by Tun Abdul Majid, the son of Tun Abbas, who was himself son of Abdul Jalil Shah IV. Self-rule was established during the reign of Tun Abdul Majid after Pahang's status was changed from a tanah pegangan (a fief) to tanah kurnia ('granted land'), thus the ruling bendahara acquired the title raja ('king'). The allegiance of the bendahara to the sultan continued, though it weakened over time. The potentate, as the senior minister, had the privilege of installing the sultan, and was himself installed by sultans. The bendahara became the ruler of the fully independent Pahang, and assumed all of the powers of the sultan.

=== Independence ===
The period 1801 to 1802 was marked by a power struggle among the four sons of Tun Abdul Majid; Tun Abdul Mutalib, Tun Muhammad, Tun Koris and Tun Da. Upon the death of Tun Abdul Majid in 1802, Tun Muhammad was appointed by Sultan Mahmud Shah III of Johor to succeed as bendahara. However, he drowned on his journey from Riau to Pahang. Tun Koris was then appointed bendahara. He was later succeeded by his son, Tun Ali.

By the early 19th century, the Johor Empire was approaching its dismemberment, with sultan's power effectively reduced to the capital in Daik, Lingga. After 1806, the empire's constituent dominions became independent principalities, and the cultural unity that had existed between the Malay Peninsula, and islands of Riau-Lingga was gradually destroyed.

After the death of Mahmud Shah III, the empire became further divided when a succession dispute among his two sons, gave rise to two centers of power, one in Riau-Lingga, under Abdul Rahman Muazzam Shah, and the other in the Johorean mainland, under Hussein Shah.

On 17 March 1824, the Dutch and the British concluded the Anglo-Dutch Treaty, whereby it was agreed that Singapore and the peninsula should be in the British sphere of influence, while the islands south of Singapore would be in the Dutch sphere of influence. The signing of the treaty further undermined the cohesion of the Johor Empire and contributed to the emergence of Pahang and Johor as independent states.

From here, the Bendahara of Pahang grew increasingly independent. While Tun Ali had acknowledged Abdul Rahman Muazzam Shah as his overlord, the Anglo-Dutch Treaty confined the Sultan to Riau-Lingga, where he was deemed a vassal of the Dutch, and prevented him from exercising his control over the Malay Peninsula, which had come under the British protectorate.

Tun Ali declared independence from the empire by 1853, formally ending the two centuries-long union between Johor and Pahang; the dynastic union having already ended in 1699. He was able to maintain peace and stability during his reign, but his death in 1856 precipitated a civil war among his sons.

=== Civil War ===
When Tun Ali died in 1856, control over Pahang fell to his son, Tun Mutahir. Although the late Bendahara's will gave control of the Kuantan and Endau Rivers to another of his sons, Wan Ahmad, Tun Mutahir professed ignorance of this provision. Wan Ahmad retaliated, believing that he had a stronger claim since his mother was Tun Ali's principle wife. The resulting civil war divided Pahang into factions. His elder brother, Tun Mutahir was supported by Johor to the south, and by the British Straits Settlements who were then opposing the Siamese Rattanakosin Kingdom. Wan Ahmad, 22 years old at that time, was helped by the Terengganu, a Malay sultanate to the north, and by the Siamese. Both sides, whose outside supporters had ulterior motives, engaged chiefly in raids and ambushes, with occasional battles near fortifications along the vast river system of Pahang. Siamese vessels sent to assist Wan Ahmad in 1862 were routed by British warships. The war ceased soon after Wan Ahmad troops captured and established control over a number of important towns and regions in the interior, and eventually seized the capital, Pekan. Tun Mutahir retreated to Temai and in May 1863, he fled to Kuala Sedili, where he died with his son Wan Koris.

Ahmad owed his victory in the war partly to his outstanding ability as a field commander. He was formally installed ruler by his chiefs with the title Bendahara Siwa Raja Tun Ahmad. After his ascension the new Raja Bendahara proclaimed amnesty to those chiefs and subjects who had aided his enemies. He also rewarded the wealthy businessmen who had rendered him financial assistance during the war by leasing to them the state's salt and opium monopolies.

=== Klang War ===
In the early years of Tun Ahmad's reign, Pahang descended into turmoil, with various attempts made by the surviving sons of Tun Mutahir, based in Selangor, to overthrow him. The Rawas and Mandailings who earlier revolted in Pahang, and had been driven into Selangor, were using that state as a base for lightning raids into Pahang. Tun Ahmad was convinced that there would be no peace in his country until the Rawas and Mandailings were crushed. This led to Pahang's direct involvement in the Klang War on the side of Tengku Kudin, who earlier had promised an immediate payment of thirty thousand dollars and, in the event of victory, a perpetual allowance of one thousand dollars a month, and the right to the revenue of the Klang district.

In August 1872, a contingent of Pahangese forces originating from Ulu Pahang, mobilised at Bentong, crossed into Selangor and pressed on to Ulu Klang, before advancing further into Kepong. By November 1872, another contingent from Pekan arrived by sea at Klang, and formed part of the invading forces that captured Kuala Lumpur on 23 March 1873. After months of fighting, the Pahangese forces, with their allies had driven their enemies from their stronghold in Kuala Selangor into Hulu Selangor. In the ensuing fights, the enemy forces retreated further to Slim River where the Pahangese again attacked and routed them to neighbouring Perak.

By the end of the war, the Pahangese warlords established their rule over parts of Selangor, in particular the districts of Ulu Klang and Hulu Selangor. Atrocities were reported, where Rawas and Mandailings settlements were raided and pillaged. Many of inhabitants were massacred while the surviving women and children were carried off into slavery. The Jelai chief, was recorded to have returned to Pahang with a large sum of spoils and with a well-stocked harem. In November 1873, the Pahangese men who had fought in Selangor, left the country.

=== Proclamation of sultanate ===
By 1880, Tun Ahmad had begun to lose his grip over the state. Pahang's involvement in a series of wars had led to the rise of dissension among the ruling class and the various territorial chiefs, who were thenceforth divided into factions. The senior chiefs were discontented and held him responsible for their loss of prestige and autonomy. In addition, many lost the power and authority they formerly held, especially over revenue, to younger chiefs upon whom Tun Ahmad had bestowed titles as rewards for their support in the wars.

Those critical of Tun Ahmad had been punished either by his waging war upon them or by being killed. Around the same time, another one of the Tun Ahmad's half brothers, Wan Mansur, laid claim to his position. Wan Mansur turned first to Johor and then to the British, to no avail. Despite the apparent discontent, Tun Ahmad, with the support of a number of chiefs, still aspired to be sultan. In 1881, prompted by his dwindling authority both within Pahang and among his counterparts in the western Malay states, he took the title of Sultan Ahmad al-Muadzam Shah and formally proclaimed as sultan by his territorial chiefs on 12 December 1884. He was recognised by the Straits Settlements government as sultan in 1887.

Fearing that the internal disputes in Pahang would lead the British to intervene in his state, Sultan Ahmad – following the example of Johor – opened his state to foreign investors, granting vast tacts of land to them in the 1880s.

== Socio-political hierarchy ==
Pahang's traditional political and social structure was largely modelled on that of Malacca. Between 1864 and 1888, a sophisticated hierarchy existed in Pahang, with the raja bendahara at the top. Below him were the offices of orang besar berempat ('four nobles'), that trace their origins from the time of the old Pahang Sultanate. The orang besar berempat were hereditary territorial magnates who had the privilege of discussing important matters of the state with the raja bendahara and the authority to impose taxes and decide legal cases. They also performed legislative duties and played a key role in the installation of the raja bendahara.

Next in the hierarchy were the orang besar berlapan ('eight nobles'), who were also hereditary titleholders with powers specific to their territories. A third group of chiefs that exercised wide powers were the Orang Besar Raja, who were usually of non-aristocratic birth. There chiefs were issued a surat kuasa ('letter of authority') in which their rights, powers and duties were clearly stated.

A further group were the orang besar enam belas ('sixteen chiefs') who were subordinated to the principal nobles. They were generally known as the tok muda or ketuan, and were entrusted with looking after village affairs. The orang besar enam belas were typically appointed by the higher ranked nobles.

Pahangese nobles were important not only because they served as links between the people and the ruler, but also because they aided the ruler in maintaining the peace and played a significant role in augmenting the ruler's position, such as when they installed Tun Ahmad as sultan. The influence they wielded, however, also meant that they were able to undermine the ruler's authority, as was the case from the 1880s.

Among the most important minor officials were members of the bendahara's police squad, variously known as juak-juak, budak raja or hamba raja, who usually went armed with a kris and a spear.

=== List of Raja Bendahara ===
Name	Jawi Name	Reignal title	Reign
Tun Abdul Majid	تون عبد المجيد	Sri Paduka Dato' Bendahara Paduka Raja	1770–1802
Tun Muhammad	تون محمد	Sri Paduka Dato' Bendahara Sri Maharaja	1802–1803
Tun Koris	تون قرظ	Sri Paduka Dato’ Bendahara Paduka Raja	1803–1806
Tun Ali	تون علي	Sri Paduka Dato’ Bendahara Sewa Raja	1806–1847
Tun Mutahir	تون محمد طاهر	Sri Paduka Dato’ Bendahara Sri Maharaja	1847–1863
Tun Ahmad	تون أحمد	Sri Paduka Dato’ Bendahara Sewa Raja	1863–1881

=== List of Nobility titles ===
Four Nobles
Title	Territory
Orang Kaya Indera Shahbandar	Pekan
Orang Kaya Indera Pahlawan	Chenor
Orang Kaya Indera Segara	Temerloh
Orang Kaya Indera Perba Jelai	Jelai
Eight Nobles
Dato’ Setia Muda
Dato’ Setia Lela
Dato’ Setia Perkasa
Dato’ Setia Pahlawan
Dato’ Setia Raja
Dato’ Setia Wangsa
Dato’ Setia Amar Segara
Dato’ Setia Penggawa
Orang Besar Raja
Dato’ Setia jaya
Tok Pentara Raja
Tok Aria Rakna
Tok Bijaya Diraja
Sixteen Nobles
16 Tok Muda

== Economy ==
By the 19th century, Pahang's economy, like in ancient times, was still heavily dependent on the export of gold. Gold mines could be found from Bera to Jelai river basins, as observed by an English merchant in 1827. Another important export was tin, which was also mined on a large scale. The growth of the mining industry had a significant impact on Pahang's society and economy towards the end of the 19th century. Thousands of people worked in the gold mines at Jelai which had become an important trading centre in the interior.

The country also produced vegetables, yams, and tubers which came from the hinterland. An amount of sandalwood, damar, and rattans was also exported. Silk weaving existed on a small scale. Imports included opium, silk, salt, and there was small demand for European cloth.

The tin ingot money, also called 'tampang' locally, had been used since the time of old sultanate, and survived in Pahang until 1893. At the beginning of the 19th century, the solid tin slabs began to be replaced by hollowed, inscribed pieces, still approximating in appearance to the original tampang, though their intrinsic value bore little relation to their nominal worth. By 1847, the tampang money of the nominal value of one cent was being produced. Tun Ahmad, after his conquest of Pahang in 1863, called in some of the one-cent tampang, and had them re-minted and issued in the form of smaller, more debased and more imperfectly made pieces.

The monopoly of minting tampang was granted to Chinese who were permitted to mint only four times a year, up to a certain value. There were mints at Kuantan, Lepar, Semantan and Pekan, which were directly supervised by chiefs appointed by the raja bendahara. During Tun Ahmad's rule, the Imam Perang Indera Mahkota, and the Orang Kaya Bakti had a custody of moulds for tampang struck directly on behalf of him.

== Bibliography ==
- Ahmad Sarji Abdul Hamid (2011), The Encyclopedia of Malaysia, vol. 16 - The Rulers of Malaysia, Editions Didier Millet, ISBN 978-981-3018-54-9
- Andaya, Barbara Watson; Andaya, Leonard Yuzon (1984), A History of Malaysia, London: Palgrave Macmillan, ISBN 978-0-312-38121-9
- Barnard, Timothy P. (2004), Contesting Malayness: Malay identity across boundaries, Singapore: Singapore University press, ISBN 9971-69-279-1
- Benjamin, Geoffrey, Issues in the Ethnohistory of Pahang, Lembaga Muzium Negeri Pahang (Museum Authority of Pahang)
- Hood Salleh (2011), The Encyclopedia of Malaysia, vol. 12 - Peoples and Traditions, Editions Didier Millet, ISBN 978-981-3018-53-2
- Jacq-Hergoualc'h, Michel (2002). The Malay Peninsula: Crossroads of the Maritime Silk-Road (100 Bc-1300 Ad). BRILL. ISBN 90-04-11973-6.
- Khoo, Gilbert (1980), From Pre-Malaccan period to present day, New Straits Times
- Linehan, William (1973), History of Pahang, Malaysian Branch Of The Royal Asiatic Society, Kuala Lumpur, ISBN 978-0710-101-37-2
- Milner, Anthony (2010), The Malays (The Peoples of South-East Asia and the Pacific), Wiley-Blackwell, ISBN 978-1444-339-03-1
- (Tun) Suzana (Tun) Othman (2002), Institusi Bendahara: Permata Melayu yang Hilang: Dinasti Bendahara Johor-Pahang (The Bendahara Institution: The Lost Malay Jewel: The Dynasty of Bendahara of Johor-Pahang), Pustaka BSM Enterprise, ISBN 983-40566-6-4
- Zakiah Hanum (1989), Asal-usul negeri-negeri di Malaysia (The Origin of States in Malaysia), Times Books International, ISBN 978-9971-654-67-2
