= Orang Kaya Indera Shahbandar =

Noble title in the Pahang State of Malaysia, a sultanate

Orang Kaya Indera Shahbandar اورڠ كاي ايندرا شهبندر
- Creation date: 1722
- Created by: Sulaiman Badrul Alam Shah
- Peerage: Peerage of Pahang
- First holder: To' Tondek
- Present holder: Orang Kaya Indera Shahbandar ke-12 Nizar Najib
- Remainder to: See below
- Status: Extant
- Seat: Pekan

Orang Kaya Indera Shahbandar ('Mighty Noblemen Shahbandar', Jawi: اورڠ كاي ايندرا شهبندر) is a nobility title in Pahang Sultanate and one of the four highest-ranking nobles below the monarch — equivalent to Duke in some European peerage. The title traces its origin from the times of the Old Pahang Sultanate, and was historically known simply as Shahbandar ('harbourmaster'). The territory under the jurisdiction of the Shahbandar was the royal capital, Pekan, and its surrounding area stretching from Bebar river to Kuala Lepar, which mostly lies within the Pekan constituency.

During the reign of Raja Bendahara Tun Ali, the title was renamed with the additional prefixes Orang Kaya Indera ('Mighty' or 'powerful nobleman'), thus it was later known as 'Orang Kaya Indera Shahbandar'. The title is the fourth most influential among the four major chiefs, because the Shahbandar lived in the vicinity of the capital, and tended to become the monarch's minister or chief executive officer.

== Role ==
Historically, the Orang Kaya Indera Shahbandar was one of four major chiefs (Malay: Orang Besar Berempat) who wielded very wide powers in Pahang. They had the authority to impose taxation, and to decide all criminal and civil cases except those which involved capital punishment. Their power was limited only by the capacity of the monarch to restrain them, which varied according to their proximity to Pekan — the further from the court, the greater their authority. Their districts were subject to the ruler granting monopolies (Malay: serahan) on certain goods.

They were obliged to appear at Pekan once a year in the month of Muharram to pay the monarch homage (Malay: menjunjung duli) and a form of tribute (Malay: banchi). During wartime, they were required to be taken to the field with men, arms, and food. The installation of the monarch was incomplete unless the Orang Besar Berempat assisted. The Pahang constitutional theory was that the Orang Besar Berempat and, to a lesser degree, the other chiefs were the foundation upon which the monarch's authority rested.

During the time of the Johor Empire, the four major chiefs gave allegiance to the Sultan of Johor through his viceroy, the Bendahara. In time, with the sovereign being a distant figure, their allegiance tended to become more a matter of loyalty to the Bendahara personally. This became formally sealed with the establishment of the Pahang Kingdom in the late 18th century.

== Titles and style ==
The full title and style for this peerage in the Malay language is Yang Dihormat Orang Kaya Indera Shahbandar. It placed at the front of the holder's name and his other Malay styles and titles. For example,

Yang Dihormat Orang Kaya Indera Shahbandar Tun Abdul Razak Hussein.

This is different from Peerages in the United Kingdom where the title and style placed at the back of the name.

The first wife of the holder will carry the full title and style — Yang Berbahagia Toh Puan Indera.

== Succession ==
The titles of the Orang Besar Berempat were hereditary. When a chief died, his successor was required to make a ceremonial offering to the monarch before his appointment was approved. This usually took the shape of gold-hilted kris, but other forms of offering were permissible. If the eldest son of a deceased chief were unfit for the succession, it was proper to appoint a younger son, a brother, or a nephew to the chieftaincy.

== Shahbandar family ==
The present members of the Shahbandar family claim matrilineal descent from To' Tuan, a Bugis chief who settled in Pahang about 1722, married a Pahang lady, and was said to have improved the art of silk weaving in his adopted country. The patrilineal ancestor of the family is To' Tondek, the first Orang Kaya Indera Shahbandar. Furthermore, the lineage also can be traced back to the royal family of Gowa, through To' Tuan (whose real name was “Karaeng Aji”) who was the grandson of I Mappadulung Daeng Mattimung Karaeng Sanrobone known as Abdul Jalil, its 19th ruler.

After the death of Ali, the seventh Orang Kaya Indera Shahbandar, the title went to a non-family member Che Osman, son of Imam Perang Indera Mahkota Gendut. On Che Osman's death, the chieftaincy reverted to the old family in the person of Dato' Hussein. The incumbent titleholder is Nizar Najib, who is the member of Pahang State Executive Council since 1 August 2026.

The surviving genealogical record of the Shahbandar family is:

To' Tuan
To' Pongkeng
To' Pondok	To' Tondek; Orang Kaya Indera Shahbandar I
♀To' Mas	Jenal; Orang Kaya Indera Shahbandar II	Bediman; Orang Kaya Indera Shahbandar III
♀To' Embong	Jahidin; Orang Kaya Indera Shahbandar V	Ismail of Pedah; Orang Kaya Indera Shahbandar IV
Husain; Orang Kaya Indera Shahbandar VI	♀Che Sawiah	♀Che Perak	Che Husoh
Ali; Orang Kaya Indera Shahbandar VII	Haji Andak (Tuan Hakim)	Che Lambak
Muhammad Taib	Che Mat
Hussein; Orang Kaya Indera Shahbandar IX	Che Ngah	Che Mahmud
Abdul Razak; Orang Kaya Indera Shahbandar X	♀Rahah Noah	Abdul Aziz	Abdul Rani	Abdul Karim
Najib; Orang Kaya Indera Shahbandar XI	Johari	Nizam	Nazim	Nazir
Nizar; Orang Kaya Indera Shahbandar XII

== See also ==
Members of Orang Besar Berempat besides the Orang Kaya Indera Shahbandar:

- Orang Kaya Indera Pahlawan
- Orang Kaya Indera Perba Jelai
- Orang Kaya Indera Segara

== Bibliography ==
- Linehan, William (1973), History of Pahang, Malaysian Branch Of The Royal Asiatic Society, Kuala Lumpur, ISBN 978-0710-101-37-2
- Ahmad Sarji Abdul Hamid (2011), The Encyclopedia of Malaysia, vol. 16 - The Rulers of Malaysia, Editions Didier Millet, ISBN 978-981-3018-54-9
- Wan Haji Abdul Wahid Bin Haji Wan Hassan (2016), Pengenalan Orang Besar Berempat (Introduction to the four major chiefs), Portal Diraja Pahang. Pejabat KDYTM Tengku Mahkota Pahang, archived from the original on 10 December 2023
