= Pahang Civil War =

Conflict in Pahang, Malaysia

Date	1857 – 1863
Location	Pahang Kingdom
Result	Wan Ahmad victory and the formation of modern Pahang sultanate
Territorial changes	Pahang loses south Endau River basin, and southern islands including Aur, Tinggi, and others to Johor.

Belligerents
(Pahang) Wan Ahmad loyalists Terengganu Sultanate (Thailand) Rattanakosin Kingdom	(Pahang) Tun Mutahir loyalists Johor; United Kingdom: Straits Settlements

Commanders and leaders
Wan Ahmad; Baginda Omar; King Mongkut	Tun Mutahir; Temenggong Tun Daeng Ibrahim; Abu Bakar; William Orfeur Cavenagh

The Pahang Civil War (Malay: Perang Saudara Pahang, Jawi: ڤرڠ ساودارا ڤهڠ), also known as the Brothers War or the Bendahara War, was a civil war fought from 1857 to 1863, between forces loyal to the reigning Raja Bendahara of Pahang Tun Mutahir, and forces loyal to his brother Wan Ahmad, over the succession to the throne of Pahang.

When the Johor Empire waned in the early nineteenth century, the Bendahara in Pahang, Tun Ali, asserted his autonomy in Pahang, just as the Temenggong had in the state of Johor. Peace and prosperity reigned in Pahang under his rule which lasted until 1857. After his death that year, his eldest son, Tun Mutahir, succeeded him as Bendahara, but did not execute his father's wish of granting tax revenues of Kuantan and Endau provinces to his younger brother, Wan Ahmad. Wan Ahmad resented and, along with his supporters, moved to Tekong Island just outside Singapore, planning his attack.

Tun Mutahir received the backing of Johor ruler Temenggong Daeng Ibrahim, and his son Abu Bakar, who, because of their close ties with Singapore's business community, convinced many of them that British commercial interests lay with Tun Mutahir. On the other hand, Wan Ahmad enlisted the support of Sultan Ali, based in Muar, a rival claimant to the Johor throne, who saw an opportunity for revenge against the Johor Temenggong. The Siamese Rattanakosin Kingdom also weighed in on the side of Wan Ahmad, viewing the disorder as an opportunity to exercise greater control over their southern provinces and extend their influence farther south into Pahang. Sultan Baginda Omar of Terengganu also supported Wan Ahmad, seeing him as a tool to counter the rise of the Temenggong. The province of Kemaman in southern Terengganu was the primary base for many of Wan Ahmad's offensives into Pahang.

Hostilities began in November 1857, when Wan Ahmad's forces attacked Pekan town and nearby Ganchong, but failed to make significant permanent gains. In the second campaign, carried out in March 1861, the invading forces managed to fortify their position in Endau in southern Pahang, after overrunning Kuala Pahang and Kuantan. They also made significant incursions further inland, occupying more provinces further upstream on the Pahang River. However, in November, their advances were again halted by the Johor/Bendahara coalition. Wan Ahmad and his men retreated to Terengganu, rallying his disarrayed forces for another invasion.

At the early stage of the war, a mediation offer by Major General William Orfeur Cavenagh, the Governor of the British Straits Settlements, was rejected by both sides. Wan Ahmad felt that Cavenagh was biased in favor of his older brother due to the influence of the Temenggong and Singapore merchants. Tun Mutahir rejected the mediation because he was winning the war.

In 1862, Wan Ahmad launched a full-scale offensive from Terengganu, when he crossed the border from Kemaman to Ulu Tembeling (Jerantut). With the support of more Pahang chiefs who switched sides, he successfully overran the Bendahara's positions at Temerloh, Batu Gajah and Chenor. Wan Ahmad emerged victorious, with a successful final offensive against the state capital Pekan. Tun Mutahir retreated to Temai and in May 1863, he fled to Kuala Sedili in Johor, where he died with his son Wan Koris.

The six year-long conflict had destroyed much of the modicum of prosperity which Pahang had enjoyed in the heyday of Bendahara Tun Ali's rule. As noted by Sir Hugh Clifford, prior to the war, Pahang was far more populated than in modern times, but warfare which ravaged the land caused thousands of Pahang Malays to leave their country. The valley of the Lebir river in southern Kelantan, and the mountainous regions in western Pahang, near the Perak and Selangor borders, became inhabited by many Pahang Malays. As a result of the conflict, Pahang also permanently lost the area south of Endau River (corresponding to modern day Mersing province) and several islands off the coast of Endau including Aur and Tinggi, that were ceded by Tun Mutahir to Johor in return to military assistance.

== Causes of the dispute ==
A will dated May 25, 1856, issued by the fourth Raja Bendahara of Pahang, Bendahara Siwa Raja Tun Ali, is regarded as the central cause of escalating tensions in Pahang in the 1850s. Long before his death, Tun Ali had retired from active participation in the government and removed his official residence to Lami where he spent his declining years. Upon his retirement, he handed over administration to his eldest son Tun Mutahir. The old Bendahara had stated in his will that tax revenues from the Kuantan and Endau provinces were to be allocated to his favourite son Wan Ahmad. Tun Mutahir subsequently professed ignorance of this clause in the will, and failed to execute it. Wan Ahmad retaliated, believing that he had a stronger claim since his mother was Tun Ali's principal wife and claimed that his father had given him the governorships of Kuantan and Endau provinces, effectively partitioning Pahang between himself and his brother.

Tun Mutahir failed to appear at his father's death-bed to receive the last solemn injunctions which, according to Malay customs, a dying laid upon his heir. The old Bendahara's wishes, in the absence of Tun Mutahir, were communicated to Wan Ahmad who was thus provided with a pretext for attacking the validity of his brother's succession, and claiming that, he was the rightful successor to his father as Bendahara. At the funeral, the two brothers appeared with bands of fully armed followers; thanks to intervention of older Chiefs, the obsequies were carried out without bloodshed. The late viceroy was buried at the royal cemetery in Kuala Pahang, a suburb of Pekan.

Tun Mutahir's side however, questioned the very existence of such will and the validity of Wan Ahmad's claim, which they claimed as never been proven. They went on further stating that in a written affidavit dated 2nd Safar 1273 AH (corresponding to 2 October 1856), Tun Ali had actually ordered the execution of Wan Ahmad, his favourite son.

== Mobilization ==
Not long after the funeral, Wan Ahmad proceeded to Tekong Island, off Singapore, to make preparations for an attack upon Tun Mutahir who had taken over as Bendahara of Pahang, assuming the title of Bendahara Sri Maharaja. In July 1857, Temenggung Ibrahim of Johor requested the Governor of the Straits Settlements to prevent Ahmad from fitting armed vessels at Tekong Island for an attack on Pahang.

In 1857, Mahmud Muzaffar Shah of Riau-Lingga, recently deposed by the Dutch, began intriguing to get himself recognized as Sultan of Pahang, a territory historically part of the Johor Empire and ruled by his ancestor, but declared independent in 1853 by the late Tun Ali. He initially sided with Bendahara Tun Mutahir, but after getting no encouragement, sided with Wan Ahmad for his own ends.

Temenggong Daeng Ibrahim, then ruler of the remainder of Johor, calculated that if the former Sultan, the head of the old Johor royal family, would to reassert his authority in Pahang, it would have spelt danger to his administration in Johor, hence his opposition to Wan Ahmad. The Temenggong also believed that Tun Mutahir had a stronger claim to the Bendahara-ship, and that he himself had designs of a united Johor-Pahang commonwealth. The Temenggong also reckoned that Tun Mutahir was of advanced age, and his sons - opium addicts - were of little account, it would not be difficult to dominate them.

To add to the political complications, the Siamese, who indirectly controls the autonomous states of Kalantan and Trangkanu to the north, also aspired to revive its ancient suzerainty over Pahang, and covertly supported the pretensions of the former Sultan of Riau-Lingga and Wan Ahmad. Terengganu, too, was brought in the game, and supported Wan Ahmad with men and arms. Tun Mutahir, in turn, was supported by the Temenggong of Johor, Daeng Ibrahim. The British colonial authorities in the Straits Settlements too opposed the Siamese pretensions, and, for fear of offending the Dutch, countered the intrigues of the former Sultan of Riau-Lingga. The British were also attempting to prevent any interruption of growing British trade with Pahang.

== Wars ==
=== War of the Kemaman men ===
In July 1857, while Wan Ahmad was in Singapore preparing for his offensive, conflict between his followers and those of the Temenggong of Johor were narrowly averted, and both parties went around with arms concealed on their person. Wan Ahmad soon proceeded to Kemaman in southern Terengganu, where he recruited more men for his venture. The Sultan of Terengganu gave Wan Ahmad his full support, to the extent of ordering penghulus of Kemaman province, under the threat of punishment, to give every kind of assistance to Wan Ahmad's forces.

In October 1857, Tun Mutahir received a letter, purportedly from Terengganu, in which the Sultan denounced Wan Ahmad's plans. The authenticity of this letter was doubtful, but it had the effect of putting the Bendahara and his supporters off their guard, since they were unaware of recent events in Kemaman. Confident of their position, Tun Mutahir sent his eldest son, Engku Muda Koris (Wan Long) to Singapore for his marriage to Enche' Engku Puan Besar, daughter of Temenggong Ibrahim, which took place in November 1857. Koris was accompanied by two of his brothers, Wan Aman and Wan Da, and their followers. Pahang was thus unprepared for a seaborne offensive which Wan Ahmad launched via Terengganu that month.

The invasion was known in Pahang history as the War of the Kemaman Men (Perang Orang-Orang Kemaman), in which Wan Ahmad's forces successfully overran Pekan, of which Tun Mutahir's brother-in-law is the governor. He then attacked Ganchong, the Bendahara's stronghold located 15 km west of Pekan city, which too fell easily. There was an attempt at peace negotiations, headed by Penghulu Haji Hassan, to a detachment of Wan Ahmad's forces led by Che Lambak of Benta. But neither side trusted the other. It was reported that as soon as Che Lambak's detachment departed, Haji Hassan began conscripting soldiers from villages in northern Pahang.

Tun Mutahir fled west to Chenor in central Pahang, where he recruited more men. Supported by reinforcements from Maharaja Perba Jelai Wan Idris and his sons, Tun Mutahir counterattacked, forcing Wan Ahmad and his men to retreat to Kemaman. Wan Ahmad counterattacked Tembeling area in northeastern Pahang, bordering Terengganu. The invaders pressed the natives in Tembeling into their service and made their way downstream as far as the village of the Penghulu Raja where they threw up stockades on both banks. The Penghulu Raja was absent but the Bendahara's forces, led by Maharaja Perba's eldest son, Wan Embong and his men, Che Yahya, Che Embok, Che Uda and Che Mat Merah, engaged the invaders. After fighting for three days, the raiders fled back to Terengganu. The Tembeling chiefs were fined for deserting their station and Penghulu Raja was dismissed, and recalled to Pekan.

=== Endau campaign ===
An event in October 1858 was a major turning point. Wan Embong, the eldest son and heir of Orang Kaya Indera Maharaja Perba of Jelai Wan Idris - the most powerful of the four senior nobles of Pahang - was falsely accused of rebellion and murder, and was executed. The incident caused Wan Idris to switch his support to Wan Ahmad. Wan Aman, the Bendahara's second son, also fined the people in Ulu Jelai, Lipis, Tembeling and Semantan provinces. Those who were unable to pay the fine, were carried off as debt-slaves to Pekan. The tyranny and injustice wrought by the Bendahara's son resulted in inhabitants of the provinces going en masse to Wan Ahmad's camp.

In an attempt to strengthen his position, Tun Mutahir concluded a treaty with Temenggong Daeng Ibrahim in early 1861, whereby one agreed to help the other in case of an attack.

By March 1861, Wan Ahmad was already preparing for another onslaught. On his side were Maharaja Perba Wan Idris, Dato' Setia Muda Wan Muhammad, Tuan Mandak, Imam Perang Raja Rasu ('Tok Gajah'), Panglima Raja Cik Endut, Panglima Kakap Bahaman and other chiefs.

By April 1861, the invading forces fortified their position in Endau after conducting seaborne attacks on Kuala Pahang and Kuantan. However, in May 1861, Tun Mutahir unexpectedly retired and handed over administration to his son Wan Koris. The appointment of Wan Koris, notoriously known as a brainless opium-addict, was an advantage to Wan Ahmad. He gained more support from the people, including the Rawas of Raub, and took control of Kuala Tembeling in August 1861. Going downstream along the Pahang river from Jerantut, he took control of more settlements, after many Pahang chiefs switched sides and joined him.

In August 1861, Tun Mutahir's general, Panglima Mansu, routed Wan Ahmad troops out and once again forced him to retreat to Terengganu. His welcome by the Sultan of Terengganu however, was less cordial this time. The insurgent prince determined to try his fortune elsewhere and went to Kelantan, where he met Sultan Muhammad II ('Long Senik Mulut Merah') and Raja Muda Ahmad. During Wan Ahmad's absence from Kemaman, Abu Bakar sent a boat from Singapore in an attempt to abduct the enemy's women folk who had been left behind there, but they were faithfully guarded by Panglima Kakap Bahaman, Panglima Raja Cik Endut and a Bugis chief, Daeng Muhammad. The would-be abductors failed and returned to Singapore.

=== Temai Campaign ===
The final phase of the war was preceded with the return of Wan Idris, the Maharaja Perba of Jelai from Terengganu. This event was followed by a major uprising in northern Pahang. The Bendahara's troops led by Wan Aman, retreated south from Kuala Tembeling to Chenor.

Realising that defeat is inevitable if the conduct of war remained in the hands of the Bendahara's sons, two senior nobles, the Orang Kaya of Temerloh and Orang Kaya Shahbandar, went to Pekan and requested that the control of operations be entrusted to them. The Bendahara, perforce, agreed to this suggestion, but the tide was beginning to run fast against him.

The last significant battles saw increased involvement of Johor in the conflict under Temenggong Abu Bakar, who succeeded Daeng Ibrahim, who died in early 1862. In a proclamation dated August 23, 1862, Abu Bakar claimed that Pahang had been entrusted to his charge. He sent Johor troops, mercenaries from Perak and Johol (now Negeri Sembilan), along with ammunition and medicine supplies, as well as a schooner and a gunboat Muar to help the Bendahara. Abu Bakar's interference instead convinced the remaining Chiefs who were still on Tun Mutahir's side up to that point, to refrain from attacking Wan Ahmad, on the grounds that the Temenggung, who as an outsider, virtually directed operations, and claimed to control the country. The resentment grew to the extent that more and more chiefs, rallied to Wan Ahmad.

Wan Ahmad returned to Pahang in August 1862, greeted by thousands of his supporters near Jerantut. After making vows at the hallowed shrine of Marhum Syeikh, he fortified his position at Temerloh. He then launched an offensive against the Johor-Bugis encampment at nearby Pulau Lebak, then overran the Bendahara's forces in Batu Gajah and Chenor, forcing them to retreat to Pekan. Wan Ahmad's troops also defeated the Johor forces at Kuala Bera, before their final offensive on the capital. They conquered Pekan city with little resistance, killing sixty Bugis mercenaries.

The taking of the capital virtually ended the war; however the Bendahara's forces held up in the suburb of Temai, 20 km west of Pekan city, for another five months, before retreating further south. In spite of the Temenggong's frantic attempts, backed by men, money and arms to rally the legitimists forces, the Bendahara followers took boat in May 1863, and fled from Pahang.

== Foreign Intervention ==
=== British ===
The British Straits Settlements government maintained its policy of non-intervention throughout the beginning of the war. Any form of military assistance requested by Tun Mutahir was rejected and the British even used its influence to prevent further intervention of Siam, Terengganu and Johor. In February 1858, Temenggung Ibrahim of Johor had written to Edmund Augustus Blundell, the Governor of the Straits Settlements complaining of the 'unfriendly sentiments' which the Governor had shown towards him, when he was prevented from sending help to the Bendahara, while Wan Ahmad was allowed to use Tekong Island as a base for his attack on Pahang. The Governor also refused the request for arms transfers from Tun Mutahir in a letter dated May 2, 1858. Determined to cool down the disturbances, Blundell visited both Pahang and Terengganu. On May 17, during his stay at Kuala Terengganu, Blundell extracted a promise from the Sultan of Terengganu for his non-interference in the conflict and the removal of Wan Ahmad from Kemaman. The second appeal that came from Tun Mutahir on August 6 was also rejected, citing that the Bendahara is harbouring the former Sultan of Riau-Lingga that could pose threat to British influence.

On June 26, 1861, the new Governor, Major General Sir William Orfeur Cavenagh wrote to Baginda Omar of Terengganu, hoping that the Sultan would persuade Wan Ahmad, whom earlier launched his second invasion and occupying Kuantan, to return to Terengganu. In a letter written in July to Tun Mutahir, who at the time happened to be in Telok Blangah, Singapore, Cavenagh expressed his regret at the Bendahara's disappointment that the British had not helped to expel Wan Ahmad from Kuantan, but he pointed out that outside assistance might only embitter and prolong the struggle . Cavenagh's view changed shortly after that, when Wan Ahmad, holding Endau, was in a position to interfere with sea traffic between Pahang and Singapore.

The Governor began offering to mediate but was rejected by both sides. Wan Ahmad felt that Cavenagh was biased in favor of his older brother due to the influence of the Temenggung and Singapore merchants. Tun Mutahir refused to compromise in accordance to the will, because he was winning the war. Nevertheless, Tun Mutahir had promised to grant Wan Ahmad an allowance as compensation for the revenues of Kuantan and Endau to which, according to the terms of his father's will, his brother was entitled, but the promise had not been implemented by a written agreement, and the Governor was unable to prosecute his endeavours to effect a settlement.

On July 9, 1861, the Governor refused another Bendahara's request to help in operations against Wan Ahmad in Kuantan, but softened his refusal by a vague promise of the services of the steamer Hoogly. On July 19 the Governor wrote to the Sultan of Terengganu requesting him to persuade Wan Ahmad to leave Kemaman and cease creating disturbances. Cavenagh addressed a communication to Wan Ahmad on July 31 warning him that interference with the trade between Pahang and Singapore would result in armed intervention by the British. On August 6, the Governor, acknowledging a letter from the Bendahara in which he was informed that all was now quiet in Pahang, declined to assist in an offensive against Wan Ahmad though he hoped that the Pahang prince would keep in touch with him. He expressed the opinion that Wan Ahmad would not be able to continue the struggle at Kuantan, and that he could expect no further help from Terengganu. On August 19, the Governor again recorded his belief that Terengganu would refuse to assist the insurgents.

Towards the end of the war, when the tide had quickly turned into Wan Ahmad's favour, Cavenagh acted on his own initiative, abandoning the British policy of non intervention. Two British gunboats, HMS Coquette and HMS Scout bombarded Kuala Terengganu, the Terengganu capital, in response to the refusal of the Sultan to recall his men from campaigns in Pahang, to stop supplying Wan Ahmad with guns and gunpowder and to stop harbouring the exiled Sultan of Riau Lingga, Mahmud Muzaffar Shah. The Siamese Navy docked in Kuala Terengganu and expected to join Wan Ahmad, were also forced to return home.

=== Siam ===
The Siamese involvement began in 1861, when Wan Ahmad visited Bangkok following the failure of his second campaign. The Siamese Rattanakosin Kingdom under King Mongkut saw the disorder as an opportunity to exercise greater control over their east coast tributary states, Kelantan and Terengganu, and extend their influence farther south into Pahang. Living in Bangkok at the same time was another exile, Mahmud Muzaffar Shah, a descendant of Sultan Abdul Rahman of Riau, whom Raffles had replaced as the ruler of Johor. Mahmud claimed to be the rightful ruler of both Pahang and Johor. Mahmud, Wan Ahmad, Ali and the Siamese struck a deal to turn the civil war in their favor. The plan was to use Terengganu as a staging area and invade Pahang. Upon victory, Mahmud would be made Sultan, and, as the bendahara, Wan Ahmad would have control the government. What Ali would get out of this one can only speculate - if they won, there would then be two claimants to throne of Johor. Mahmud and Ahmad then proceeded to Terengganu with the Siamese navy.

The Siamese intervention caused great alarm in Johor and Singapore. The merchant community saw it as a threat to their economic interests not only in Pahang, where Siam had never had any influence of note, but also in Terengganu and Kelantan, where increased Siamese presence would threaten their independence and thus trade with Singapore. Cavenagh demanded that Siam withdraw. The Siamese refused, believing Cavenagh's hands were tied by the British policy of non-intervention. In 1862, Cavenagh dispatched British warships to blockade the coast off Terengganu. When the Siamese still failed to withdraw, he bombarded the fort at Kuala Terengganu. This got attention of Bangkok, and it eventually acceded to his demands.

Cavenagh was sharply criticized by the government for exceeding his authority and drawing Britain into the disputes of local Malay rulers. His action, however, was effective. The Siamese were convinced that the British would protect Kelantan and Terengganu from direct Siamese interference.

=== Johor ===
As the primary ally to Bendahara Tun Mutahir, Johor's involvement in the conflict traces its origin since the outbreak of the war. Attempts were made by Temenggong Tun Daeng Ibrahim since 1858 to assist the Bendahara, but prevented by the Straits Settlements government. In 1857, Mahmud Muzaffar Shah of Riau-Lingga, deposed by the Dutch, began intriguing to get himself recognized as Sultan of Pahang, a territory which historically part of the Johor Empire and ruled by his ancestor, but declared as an independent state in 1853 by Tun Ali . He sounded the Bendahara Tun Mutahir, but meeting with no encouragement in that quarter, attached himself to Wan Ahmad's side in furtherance of his own ends. The possession of Pahang by the former Sultan, the head of the old Johor royal family, would have spelt danger to the Temenggong's rule in Johor, hence one of the reasons for Temenggong Ibrahim's opposition to Wan Ahmad. The other factors determining the Temenggong's attitude were that Tun Mutahir had the best claim to Bendahara-ship, and that he himself had visions of creating a united Johor-Pahang state. Since Tun Mutahir was no longer young, and his opium-smoking sons were of little account, it would not be difficult to dominate them.

In June 1858, Abu Bakar, the Temenggong's son, was sent to Pahang to wed Che Engku Chik, a sister of Wan Koris. The Bendahara's eldest son had in 1857 married Abu Bakar's sister. These marriages, which had a political significance, strengthened the Bendahara's position, while he, in return for a promise of assistance, ceded to Johor the land which lay between Endau and Sedili Besar, a territory which, from the middle of the 15th century, had belonged to Pahang. The friendly relations between the two, were sealed in a treaty concluded in 1861 whereby the one agreed to help the other in case of attack. Not long after the treaty, Temenggong Ibrahim had died and was succeeded by his son Abu Bakar who redoubled the previous efforts made against Wan Ahmad on January 27, 1862, he had been informed by the governor on the approval of the treaty whereby, one of the clauses mentioned that Tioman Island and all islands to the south of it fell to Johor, and the Pahang-Johor boundary was fixed on the Endau. The welcome news of the British endorsement of the treaty stimulated the Temenggong to still greater exertions on behalf of Tun Mutahir.

The last significant battles saw greater involvement of Johor in the conflict. Temenggong Abu Bakar, in a proclamation dated August 23, 1862, claimed that Pahang had been entrusted to his charge. He sent Johor-Bugis troops, Perak and Johol mercenaries, ammunitions, medicine, a schooner and a gunboat Muar to help the Bendahara. He tried to persuade the Sultan of Terengganu to prevent Wan Ahmad, from invading Pahang from Dungun. He requested Sultan Jaafar of Perak not to sell arms to Wan Ahmad's followers. In a letter to Wan Koris and other Chiefs written in August or September 1862, the Temenggong offered a reward of $500 for the head of Wan Ahmad, and threatened that Johor would declare war on Terengganu if it persisted in helping the insurgent prince.

=== Terengganu ===
Sultan Baginda Omar of Terengganu fully supported Wan Ahmad's cause, seeing him as a tool to counter the rise of the Temenggong of Johor. Apart from supplying men and guns, Terengganu also allowed Kemaman and Dungun to be used as a base for much of the campaigns carried out by Wan Ahmad during the war.

On May 17, 1858, during his stay at Kuala Terengganu, Governor Blundell extracted a promise from the Sultan that Wan Ahmad should be removed from Kemaman. In pursuance of his promise, the Terengganu ruler ordered Wan Ahmad to leave Kemaman and reside at Kuala Terengganu. Wan Ahmad compiled, only for a while, as soon as the Governor left for Singapore, he returned and renewed his warlike preparations. On June 26, 1861, during the second phase of the war, the new Governor Cavenagh wrote to Baginda Omar hoping that the Sultan would persuade Wan Ahmad to return to Terengganu. On July 19 the Governor again wrote to the Sultan of Terengganu requesting him to persuade Wan Ahmad to leave Kemaman and to cease in creating disturbances.

Despite repetitive calls, with the threat of war, from both the British and Johor to cease his support to Wan Ahmad, Baginda Omar continued his assistance right until the end of the war. As a result of his refusal, while the Johor forces was infiltrating inland to halt Wan Ahmad's advance, the Terengganu capital was bombarded by the Royal Navy in 1862.

== Aftermath ==
=== Death of Tun Mutahir and the New Bendahara ===
Before fleeing from Pahang in May 1863, Tun Mutahir and Wan Koris fell seriously ill, and Wan Aman was nominated as the new Raja Bendahara designate by the Shahbandar, but Wan Aman was a ruler without a country as Wan Ahmad had won the day. Tun Mutahir and Wan Koris died at Kuala Sedili, near Kota Tinggi in May 1863, resulting no real claimant left contesting Wan Ahmad's claim.

The victor was formally installed ruler by his chiefs with the title Bendahara Siwa Raja Tun Ahmad, ending the fratricidal struggle between Tun Mutahir and Wan Ahmad. Judged in terms of loss of human life, little damage had been done in the war, but the misery caused to the Pahang peasants was incalculable. Harried by both sides, impressed, forced to provide food for the conflicting forces, deprived of what little property they possessed, subjected to great cruelties particularly by Tun Mutahir's sons, their villages overrun by foreign fighting men, their loss was unenviable. Many of those who could do so fled to adjoining states.

The modicum of Bendahara Tun Ali's rule quickly disappeared in the conflict of the warring factions. At the least, Wan Ahmad's victory meant for the peasants that thenceforth had only one set of masters to serve.

=== Amnesty ===
Bendahara Tun Ahmad proclaimed an amnesty to all the chiefs and people who had sided with his enemies. Advantage was taken of the indemnity by the Shahbandar, Che Lambak and their followers, who returned to Pahang and were received in a friendly fashion by the new ruler. The new Bendahara appointed a new council of chiefs, drafted laws, and prescribed punishments for crimes. He conferred titles to those who had distinguished themselves in the war. He sent territorial magnates back to reside in their own provinces. He forgave his kinsmen Engku Ngah and Engku Chik and married their sister Che Puan Bongsu (later known as Tun Besar) by whom he had a daughter, Tun Long. He waived, for three years, all duties on produce entering or leaving Pahang, but this waiver did not apply to Kuantan province, his private reserve. There was a famine caused by drought and a plague of rats in northern Pahang for two years after the war. Tun Ahmad issued free stocks of rice to the starving peasantry.

=== British recognition ===
In October 1863, the Bendahara informed the Governor that he had been invited to Pahang by the four senior nobles, and had conquered that state on Tuesday, 22nd of the month of Dhu al-Hijjah, 1279 AH (corresponds to June 10, 1863). Before the end of the year, Governor Cavenagh had reported to the home government that the people of Pahang were becoming reconciled to their present ruler, and that the country was rapidly becoming tranquillised and trade was reviving. In consequence to this report, the British Government decided to recognise Tun Ahmad as the de facto ruler.

=== Territorial dispute with Johor ===
The armed conflict between the new Bendahara and Temenggong Abu Bakar ceased with the expulsion of Tun Mutahir from Pahang, but tensions remained. A bone of contention was the question of several islands off the coast of southeastern Pahang and northeastern Johor. In return for the Temenggong's assistance, Tun Mutahir ceded to Johor Tioman island and several islands to the south, which from time immemorial, had belonged to Pahang. Tun Ahmad refused to recognise the validity of this cession. In October 1863, he summoned the Chiefs of Tinggi, Tioman and other islands to meet him, and obtained their allegiance.

On July 2, 1866, the Bendahara acknowledged a letter in which Governor Cavenagh had declared he was unable to recognize the validity of Tun Ahmad's authority over the Pahang islands on the ground that they were subject to the rule of the Temenggong. He respectfully replied that Tioman, Tinggi, Aur and other islands had always been subject to Pahang. In September 1866, the Temenggong's gunboats seized Pahang subjects on the islands and arrested fishermen. Tun Ahmad refrained from retaliating to such provocation and decided to settle the matter peacefully. When the Temenggong's small fleet invaded Aur Island again in June 1867, the Bendahara sent Che Lambak and Imam Perang Mahkota to Singapore to relate the history of the islands off Pahang. The envoys brought a sword as a gift with a small note; "a humble present, but it may be of use to our friend."

In the same year, Abu Bakar finally receded to the demand and had offered to cede to his enemy the islands of Tioman, Seri Buat, Kaban and others to the north of latitude 2°40', and in 1868 Governor Sir Harry Ord awarded them to Pahang. The boundary dispute was not, however, finally settled till 1897 when Ord's decision was confirmed, the left bank of the Endau River going to Pahang, the right to Johor. The islands north of a line drawn east from the Endau River remained with Pahang, those to the south were awarded to Johor.

=== Later conflicts ===
Tun Mutahir's surviving sons, Wan Aman, Wan Da and Wan Abdullah made an attempt to regain their father's country in 1866. They sent an invading force that took a fort at Jerang in Ulu Triang. The magnates of Temerloh and Chenor stemmed the invasion, and after a month of fighting, the Pahang men forced the invaders to flee. In 1868, Wan Da launched another invasion, infiltrating his forces into Raub. They were defeated at Sega by the Pahang troops and forced to retreat to Selangor. Wan Ahmad attributed Wan Da's attack to the machinations of his enemy Temenggong Abu Bakar.

Wan Aman and Wan Da had later transferred their activities to Klang where they joined Raja Abdullah. They soon broke with him, and went over to Raja Mahdi's side, in return for a promise that he would help them to conquer Pahang. By this time, Temenggong Abu Bakar had disassociated himself from any further armed intervention in Pahang. In early 1870, Wan Aman and Wan Da, assisted by forces of Raja Mahdi, invaded Pahang through Raub. The defenders built defensive installations at various points along the Lipis River. Fighting took place at Kuala Pa near Temu, and in three days the invaders captured eight stockades. Reinforcements from Pekan led by Haji Muhammad Nor arrived and burnt down the insurgents headquarters in Raub and took their fort in Sempalit. Panglima Kakap Bahaman, the magnate of Semantan, had closed all the tracks to Selangor and lay in wait for the retreating invaders, but Wan Aman extricated himself from an awkward situation by coming to terms with his enemies, and he and his men were allowed to depart after a conflict which had lasted for nine months.

On his return to Selangor, after his unsuccessful invasion, Wan Aman quarrelled with his erstwhile ally Raja Mahdi, and went over to the side of Tengku Kudin by whom he was put in charge of Hulu Selangor. In November 1871, Wan Aman was captured by Sayyid Mashor, one of Raja Mahdi's supporters. His brother Wan Da proceeded to Pahang, made his peace with his uncle and produced a letter from Tengku Kudin in which the prince appealed for Pahang assistance in the Selangor Civil War. Bendahara Tun Ahmad had been affronted at the treatment accorded to his nephew in Hulu Selangor. The Rawas and Mandailings who earlier revolted in Pahang, and had been driven into Selangor, were using that state as a base for lightning raids into Pahang. The Bendahara was convinced that there would be no peace in his country until these freebooters were crushed. He agreed to help and sent Pahang troops that attacked in two directions, one that marched via land route from Bentong to Ulu Klang and another via sea route that landed at Klang. The Pahang troops, consisting mostly veterans of civil war in their homeland, quickly subdued the Raja Mahdi forces and occupied the Selangor capital, Kuala Lumpur in March 1873. Pahang's involvement had turned the tide of war to Tengku Kudin's favor, effectively ending the war in Selangor.

== See also ==
- Naning War
- Larut Wars
- Klang War

== Bibliography ==
- Ahmad Sarji Abdul Hamid (2011), The Encyclopedia of Malaysia, vol. 16 - The Rulers of Malaysia, Editions Didier Millet, ISBN 978-981-3018-54-9
- Baker, Jim (2010), Crossroads: A Popular History of Malaysia and Singapore, Marshall Cavendish, ISBN 978-9812-615-22-0
- Leong, Sze Lee (2012), A Retrospect on the Dust-Laden History: The Past and Present of Tekong Island in Singapore, World Scientific Publishing Company, ISBN 978-9814-365-96-3
- Linehan, William (1973), History of Pahang, Malaysian Branch Of The Royal Asiatic Society, Kuala Lumpur, ISBN 978-0710-101-37-2
