= Orang Kaya Indera Pahlawan =

Orang Kaya Indera Pahlawan is a nobility title in Pahang Sultanate and one of the four highest ranking nobles below the monarch. The title traces its origin from the times of the Old Pahang Sultanate, and was historically known as Maharaja Indera Pahlawan. The territory under his jurisdiction is Chenor, and land between the Bera and Kuala Luit (corresponding to most of Maran constituency, and some parts of Bera constituency).

During the reign of Raja Bendahara Tun Ali, the title was renamed 'Orang Kaya Indera Pahlawan', with the added prefixes 'Orang Kaya'. The title is the third most influential among the four major chiefs, since his territory is the second most closer to the capital after Orang Kaya Indera Shahbandar.

== Role ==
Historically, the Orang Kaya Indera Pahlawan was part of the Orang Besar Berempat ('four major chiefs') that wielded very wide powers in Pahang. They had the authority to impose taxation and to decide all criminal and civil cases except those which involved capital punishment. In fact, their power was limited only by the capacity of the monarch to restrain them, and it varied according to their proximity to Pekan, the further from the court, the greater their authority. They were obliged to appear at Pekan once a year to menjunjung duli ('pay homage'). They had to pay a form of tribute called banchi to the monarch. Their districts were subject to serahan; the obligation to buy, at exorbitant prices, goods the monopoly for the sale of which, in certain localities the ruler was in the habit of granting to one of his favourites.

In the month of Muharram. they appeared at court with offerings. In the time of war they were required to take the field with men, arms and food. The installation of the monarch was incomplete unless the Orang Besar Berempat assisted thereat. The Pahang constitutional theory was that the Orang Besar Berempat and, to a lesser degree, the other chiefs were the foundation upon which the monarch's authority rested.

During the time of Johor Empire, the four major chiefs gave allegiance to the Bendahara as representing the Sultan, but, in time, the sovereign being to them a nebulous figure, their allegiance tended to become more and more a matter of loyalty to the Bendahara personally. This became formally sealed with the establishment of Pahang Kingdom in the late 18th century.

== Succession ==
The titles of the Orang Besar Berempat were hereditary. When a chief died, his successor, before approval of his appointment, was required to make a ceremonial offering to the monarch. This usually took the shape of gold-hilted kris, but other forms of offering were permissible. If the eldest son of a deceased chief were unfitted for the succession, it was proper to appoint a younger son, a brother, or a nephew to the chieftaincy.

== Genealogical tree ==
The present family of Orang Kaya Indera Pahlawan claim matrilineal descent from a Minangkabau, To' Gemok who came to Pahang following the route by Ulu Serting, Penarik and Bera, and founded a settlement in Chenor. The first mention in records of this chieftaincy was in 1740 when Sultan Sulaiman Badrul Alam Shah summoned the chief to Pekan. The original territory of the Chenor fief was the land extending from the Bera to Kuala Luit. The Chenor chiefs are related to the royal family of Pahang through Tun Ismail, who is the second son of Tun Ali by his wife Cik Wan Ngah.

To' Gemok; Orang Kaya Indera Pahlawan I
Ismail; Orang Kaya Indera Pahlawan II
Hassan	Adam; Orang Kaya Indera Pahlawan III	Tun Ali; Raja Bendahara
Tok Tuit; Orang Kaya Indera Indera Pahlawan IV	Kuyut	♀Che Itam	Tun Ismail
Husain; Orang Kaya Indera Indera Pahlawan V	Engku Mahmud
Engku Abdullah; Orang Kaya Indera Pahlawan VI	Engku Salleh	Engku Ngah Abu Bakar
Wan Hassan
Wan Abdul Wahid; Orang Kaya Indera Pahlawan VII

== See also ==
- Orang Kaya Indera Perba Jelai
- Orang Kaya Indera Segara
- Orang Kaya Indera Shahbandar

== Bibliography ==
- Linehan, William (1973), History of Pahang, Malaysian Branch Of The Royal Asiatic Society, Kuala Lumpur, ISBN 978-0710-101-37-2
- Ahmad Sarji Abdul Hamid (2011), The Encyclopedia of Malaysia, vol. 16 - The Rulers of Malaysia, Editions Didier Millet, ISBN 978-981-3018-54-9
- Wan Haji Abdul Wahid Bin Haji Wan Hassan (2016), Pengenalan Orang Besar Berempat (Introduction to the four major chiefs), Portal Diraja Pahang. Pejabat KDYTM Tengku Mahkota Pahang, archived from the original on 2023-12-10
