= Flag and coat of arms of Pahang =

Symbols of the Malaysian state

The flag and the coat of arms of Pahang are state symbols of Pahang, Malaysia. While adopting simpler design on its flag and arms, the state symbols remain representative towards its administration, monarchy, and economy. In addition, its arms includes elements related to local superstitions.

== Flag ==
=== Design ===
Pahang
- Use: Civil and state flag
- Proportion: 1:2
- Adopted: 1903
- Design: Two equally horizontal bands of white and black.

The current flag of Pahang was adopted in 1903. It consists of a simple horizontal bicolour flag with equally proportionate bands of white on the upper half and black on the lower half. The black represents the official colour of the bendahara, which was once the administrator of the state, while the white represents the Sultan of Pahang; the white over the black symbolises Pahang as a sovereign state with a royal monarch, as well as its presence of special privileges, laws, customs and codes of conduct, and specific rights of the Sultan.

=== Historical variants ===
As a formerly independent state under the Federated Malay States, Pahang adopted a naval jack or ensign for use on government ships, consisting of a quartered saltire that bore the colours of the state flag: Black on the leftmost and rightmost quarters, and white on the upper and lower quarters. The merger of the state into the Federation of Malaya in 1948 and the adoption of a unified maritime flag rendered the Pahang jack obsolete.

As a member of the Federated Malay States, Pahang was also assigned a British Resident, and with it, a flag for the Resident that was essentially the state flag forked at the fly. The flag is similarly obsolete after the abolishment of British Residents in the state in 1942 following the Japanese occupation.

Flag of Pahang (1853—87)

Flag of Pahang (1887—1903)

Flag of Chief of Jelai

British Resident flag of Pahang (1853—1957)

Jack of Pahang

=== Royal Standards ===
The royal family of Pahang flies a series of designated Royal Standards for its highest ranking members.

Standard of the Sultan

Standard of Tengku Ampuan (Queen Consort)

Standard of Tengku Mahkota (Crown Prince)

Standard of Tengku Puan (Crown Princess)

Standard of Pemangku Raja (Regent)

Standard of Tengku Ampuan Besar (Queen Dowager)

Standard of Wakil Sultan (Representative of the Sultan)

== Emblem ==
State emblem of Pahang
- Armiger: Pahang
- Shield: A spear head in pale surmounted by two tusks in saltire. (Or: Sultan, Argent: state seal)

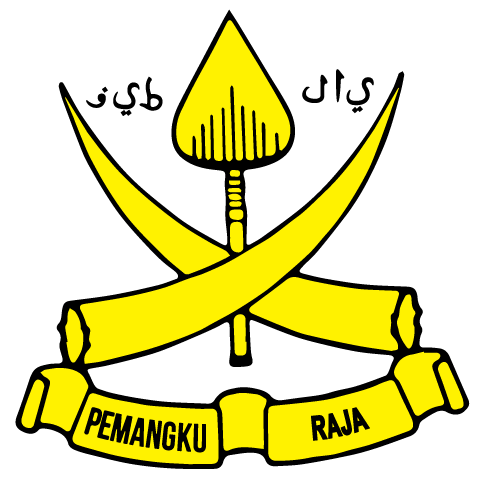
The Regent's emblem

Pahang's state emblem (Malay: Jata Pahang) consists of four elements: the spear head, Jawi scriptures between the spear head, dual tusks, and a motto at the bottom. Another emblem for the Sultan is entirely coloured in gold. The seal may be illustrated with only the aforementioned elements or included against a shield of the state flag: two horizontal white and black bars (Per fess Argent and Sable).

Details of the emblem' elements are as follows:

Spear head
The spear head is a central element of the arms, shaped similarly as a coffee leaf. Being golden, the dagger head is also intended to represent the weapon's hardiness in battle, as a white dagger was thought to be capable of piercing any armour.
Jawi letters flanking the spear head
Six Jawi letters are written between the upper half of the spear head, divided into two short phrases: "Ya alif lam. Tho ya fa." (ﻱﺍﻝ ﻁﻱف). The letters combined make the phrase يا لطيف yā Laṭīf which in Arabic means "o gentle one", alluding to the belief of Pahangite rulers having a calm nature so inherent that they lack the need to resort to violence to instil peace in the state; the name is also known as one of Allah's many attributes appropriate for the Sultan being the upholder of Islam as the state's official religion. The phrase itself is also once believed to be a powerful spell against evil magic.

Tusks
A pair of white tusks criss-cross over and uplift the spear head, its shaper end pointing upwards. The tusks represent the abundance of elephants (specifically, Asian elephants) in the state and its importance in Pahang's economy in the distance past through its trade of elephant tusks. The tusks, like the spear head, are coloured in white.

Motto
The white motto is located at the bottom of the arms in the form of a banner that includes the phrase "Negeri Pahang" (Pahang State) written in both Latin and Jawi scripts.
