= Tun Mutahir =

Tun Mutahir may refer to:

- Tun Mutahir of Malacca (died 1510), Bendahara of Malacca
- Tun Mutahir of Pahang (1803–1863), Bendahara of Pahang
