= Kampung Jahang =

Village in Kampar, Perak, Malaysia

Coordinates: 4°26′N 101°11′E

Kampung Jahang or (commonly known as Jahang by locals) is a traditional Malay village located within the outskirt of Gopeng, Perak. It is one of many Malay villages located to the east side of Gopeng, near to the hill slopes. Everybody here is from the Malay Rawa community. There are very little commercial activity here however there are small kiosk erected by locals to sell foods (kueh) and even beverages. The residents usually go to Gopeng to get their rations and other significant deals. Traditional Malay village like Kampung Jahang will be at its most vibrant whenever Aidilfitri comes annually where most of the migrated kampung folks will stay up to a week in the kampung with their families.
