= Ahmad Muʽazzam =

Sultan of Pahang (r. 1881–1914)

Ahmad Al-Muʽazzam Shah أحمد المعظم شاه
- Sultan of Pahang
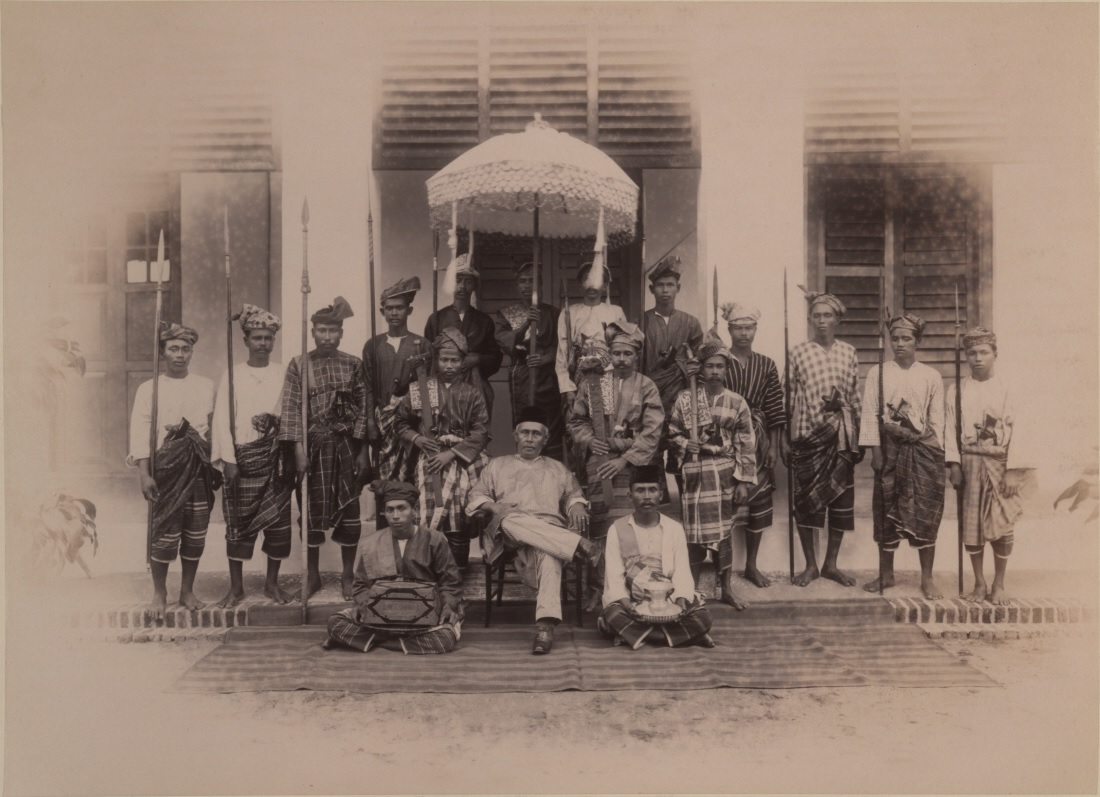
- Sultan Ahmad Al-Muʽazzam Shah and his personal attendants, 1897.

Raja Bendahara of Pahang
- Reign: 10 June 1863 – 8 August 1881
- Predecessor: Tun Mutahir

Sultan of Pahang
- Reign: 16 August 1881 – 13 April 1909
- Installation: 25 September 1884
- Successor: Mahmud of Pahang
- Born: 23 May 1836; Pulau Maulana, Pekan, Pahang
- Died: 9 May 1914 (aged 77); Istana Pantai, Pekan, Pahang
- Burial: 11 May 1914; Royal Cemetery, Kampung Marhum, Kuala Pahang, Pahang
- Spouse: Cik Besar Yang Atur binti Abdullah; Cik Amah binti Jamut; Engku Besar of Terengganu; Tun Besar Fatima binti Tun Muhammad; Che’ Ungku Pah binti Dato’ Temenggong Sri Maharaja Tun Ibrahim; Encik Zubaida binti Abdullah; Cik Hajjah Fatimah binti Haji Muhammad Talib; Cik Kusuma binti Tok Minal Daeng Koro; Cik Santoma; Cik Wan Mandak Kiri; Cik Halimah; Cik Bakai; Cik Mah binti Awang Tukang; Cik Maimunah; Cik Fatimah Selat
- Issue: Tun Muda Besar; Tengku Long Mahmud; Tengku Ali; Tengku Abdullah; Tengku Sulaiman; Tengku Jusoh; Tengku Umar; Tengku Muhammad; Tengku Long; Tun Salamah; Tengku Dalam; Tengku Nong Fatimah; Tengku Hajjah Kalsum; Tengku Hajjah Mariam
Names
- Kebawah Duli Yang Maha Mulia Paduka Seri Baginda Sultan Ahmad Al-Muʽazzam Shah Ibni Al-Marhum Bendahara Sri Maharaja Tun Ali
- Father: Raja Bendahara Seri Maharaja Tun Wan Ali bin Almarhum Tun Koris
- Mother: Cik Long Binti Encik Esah (Che Puan Lingga)
- Religion: Sunni Islam

Sultan Ahmad Al-Muʽazzam Shah ibni Almarhum Raja Bendahara Sri Maharaja Tun Wan Ali (Jawi: سلطان أحمد المعظم شاه ابن المرحوم بندهار سري مهاراج تون علي; 23 May 1836 – 9 May 1914) was the sixth raja bendahara of Pahang and the founder and first modern sultan of Pahang. Commonly known as Tun Wan Ahmad before his accession, he seized the throne in 1863 after defeating his elder brother Tun Mutahir in the Pahang Civil War, assuming the title Sri Paduka Dato' Bendahara Siwa Raja Tun Ahmad. In the early years of his reign, Pahang descended into turmoil, with various attempts made by the surviving sons of Tun Mutahir, based in Selangor, to overthrow him. This led to Pahang's direct involvement in the Selangor Civil War that brought it to a conclusive end.

The civil wars that ravaged the land had led to the rise of dissension among the ruling class and territorial chiefs who were thenceforth divided into factions. In 1881, prompted by his dwindling authority both within Pahang and among his counterparts in the western Malay states, Tun Wan Ahmad took the title of Sultan Ahmad al-Muadzam Shah and was formally proclaimed as sultan by his chiefs two years later. The event marked the revival of Pahang as a sultanate after more than two centuries of union with the crown of Johor. Ahmad gained formal recognition from the British Straits Settlements government in 1887, in return for signing a treaty with the British which compelled him to accept a British Agent in his court.

== Early life ==
On 23 May 1836 at Pulau Maulana, Pekan, Che Puan Long, a wife of the 22nd bendahara of the Johor Empire, Tun Ali, gave birth to a son Wan Ahmad, for whom an Arab, Habib Abdullah ibni Omar Al-Attas foretold he would lead a great future. Wan Ahmad was the patrilineal descendant of the 13th bendahara who was proclaimed as the 10th sultan of Johor, Abdul Jalil Shah IV. After the accession, Abdul Jalil was given the special province of the bendaharas, who ruled the state as the vassal of the Johor Sultanate. However, during the reign of Tun Abdul Majid, and with the gradual dismemberment of the empire, Pahang's status changed from a provincial state (Tanah Pegangan) to a fiefdom (Tanah Kurnia), thus the reigning bendahara assumed the title raja bendahara. It was not until 1853 that Pahang, under the rule of his father, formally declared independence.

Wan Ahmad was educated privately at his father's court. He was granted Kuantan and Endau as his fief by his father when he was very young. However, his control of these territories was opposed by his brother, after the latter's succession in 1857.

== Civil war ==
The dispute over the territories of Kuantan and Endau prompted Wan Ahmad to oppose his elder brother Tun Mutahir. The tensions among the two brothers escalated into a bitter civil war, shortly after the death of their father in 1857. Tun Mutahir was supported by Johor to the south, and by the British Straits Settlements who were then opposing the Siamese Rattanakosin Kingdom. Wan Ahmad, 22 years old at that time, was helped by the Terengganu faction, a Malay sultanate to the north, and by the Siamese. Both sides, whose outside supporters had ulterior motives, engaged chiefly in raids and ambushes, with occasional battles near fortifications along the vast riverine system of Pahang. Siamese vessels sent to assist Wan Ahmad in 1862 were routed by British warships. The war ceased soon after Wan Ahmad's troops captured and established control over a number of important towns and regions in the interior, and eventually seized the capital, Pekan. Tun Mutahir retreated to Temai and in May 1863, he fled to Kuala Sedili, where he died with his son Wan Koris.

Ahmad owed his victory in the war partly to his outstanding ability as a field commander. He was formally installed as ruler by his chiefs with the title Bendahara Siwa Raja Tun Ahmad. Ahmad proclaimed amnesty to those chiefs and subjects who had aided his enemies. He also rewarded the wealthy businessmen who had rendered him financial assistance during the war by leasing to them the state's salt and opium monopolies.

The Sultan was appointed an Honorary Knight Commander of the Order of St Michael and St George (KCMG) in the November 1902 Birthday Honours list.

== Reign ==
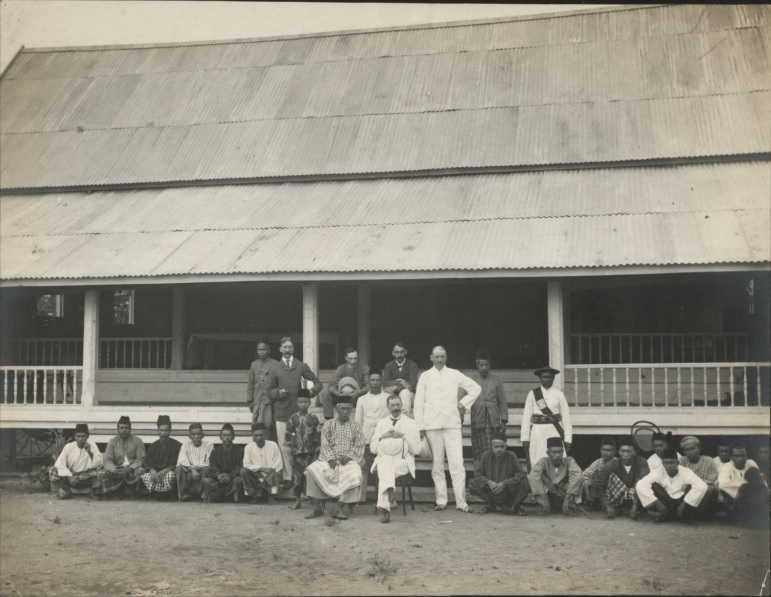
Sultan Ahmad Al-Muʽazzam Shah seated with Acting Resident of Pahang, Frederic Duberly, circa 1902.

During his reign, Pahangese politics came under the purview of the British government. Increasing pressure was exerted upon the sultan by the residing British Agent to administer the state according to the British ideals of "just rule" and modernisation. This had effectively plunged the state into discontent with clashes between traditional chiefs and the British. The British ultimately compelled Tun Wan Ahmad to make his state a British protectorate in 1888 and John Pickersgill Rodger was appointed as Pahang's first resident.

The work of building up a state administration began with the creation of the Supreme Court, a police force and a State Council. In 1895, the sultan entered into a Treaty of Federation to form the Federated Malay States. Tun Wan Ahmad transferred his executive and administrative powers to his eldest son Tengku Long Mahmud, in 1909 due to old age, retaining his position and titles as head of state until his death in 1914.

Ahmad Muʽazzam Bendahara Dynasty Born: 1836 Died: 1914
Regnal titles
Preceded by Tun Mutahir	Raja Bendahara of Pahang; 1863–1881	Succeeded by (post abolished); Succession title: Sultan of Pahang (1881–1909)
Preceded by Newly Created	Sultan of Pahang; 1881–1909	Succeeded by Mahmud of Pahang
