= Tun Koris of Pahang =

Bendahara of the Pahang Kingdom

Tun Koris تون قرظ
- Raja Bendahara of Pahang
- Reign: 1803–1806
- Predecessor: Tun Muhammad
- Successor: Tun Ali
- Died: 11 March 1806
- Burial: Royal Cemetery, Kuala Pahang
- Spouse: Engku Puan Kechik Engku Mai binti Temenggong Tun Abdul Jamal
- House: Bendahara dynasty
- Father: Tun Abdul Majid
- Mother: Bugis Princess of Endau
- Religion: Sunni Islam

Sri Paduka Dato' Bendahara Paduka Raja Tun Koris ibni Almarhum Dato' Bendahara Paduka Raja Tun Abdul Majid (died 11 March 1806) was the 23rd Bendahara of the Johor Sultanate and the third Raja Bendahara of the Pahang Kingdom who reigned from 1803 to 1806.

== Bendaharaship ==
Tun Koris was the third son of the 19th Bendahara of Johor Tun Abdul Majid who succeeded his elder brother, Tun Muhammad in 1803 after he drowned at sea off the coast of Endau following a shipwreck.

Tun Muhammad's 40 shipmates survived the shipwreck, but when they arrived at Pekan, Tun Koris killed all but two of them for failing to save Tun Muhammad. He stabbed them to death with a long kris. Koris' treatment of the ship-wrecked survivors earned him a reputation as cruel.

Tun Koris had been raised in Endau by his Bugis mother and made Tuan Jambul his chief minister. He died in 1806, leaving behind two sons and a daughter. He was succeeded by his son, Tun Ali.

== Bibliography ==
- Linehan, William (1973), History of Pahang Ark, ISBN 978-0710-101-37-2

Tun Koris of Pahang Bendahara dynasty Died: 1806
Regnal titles
Preceded by Tun Muhammad	Raja Bendahara of Pahang; 1803-1806	Succeeded by Tun Ali
