= Tun Muhammad of Pahang =

Bendahara of the Pahang Kingdom

Tun Muhammad تون محمد
- Raja Bendahara of Pahang
- Reign: 1802–1803
- Predecessor: Tun Abdul Majid
- Successor: Tun Koris
- Died: 1803; At sea near Tioman Island
- House: Bendahara dynasty
- Father: Tun Abdul Majid
- Religion: Sunni Islam

Sri Paduka Dato' Bendahara Sri Maharaja Tun Muhammad ibni Almarhum Dato' Bendahara Paduka Raja Tun Abdul Majid (died 1803) was the 22nd bendahara of the Johor Sultanate and also the second raja bendahara of the Pahang Kingdom, reigning from 1802 to 1803.

Born as Engku Sentul, he was the second son of Bendahara Tun Abdul Majid, who he succeeded on his death in 1802.

During the reign of his father, Tun Muhammad settled at Chenor. When the news of the murder of his brother, Tun Abdul Mutalib, reached him, he hurried to Pekan with his troops. At Pekan, he found that the murderer, Temenggong Abdul Jamal had left for Riau. In spite of his father's attempt to restrain him, he followed the Temenggong. On his arrival at Riau, he found that Abdul Jamal was dead.

Tun Muhammad decided to settle at Riau, and when his father died in 1802, the Sultan installed him as the next bendahara. Tun Muhammad then set sail for Pahang in 1803. While he was crossing from Tioman Island to Endau, his boat was wrecked in a storm and he, and one of his wives were trapped in a cabin and died. He was known posthumously as Marhum Mangkat di Laut ('the late chief who died at sea') after his death, having had a son and a daughter. He was buried in Kg Genting, Tioman Island.

== Bibliography ==
- Linehan, William (1973), History of Pahang, Malaysian Branch Of The Royal Asiatic Society, Kuala Lumpur, ISBN 978-0710-101-37-2

Tun Muhammad of Pahang Bendahara dynasty Died: 1803
Regnal titles
Preceded by Tun Abdul Majid	Raja Bendahara of Pahang; 1802–1803	Succeeded by Tun Koris
