= Tun Abdul Majid of Pahang =

High court official of the Johor Sultanate

Tun Abdul Majid تون عبد المجيد
- Raja Bendahara of Pahang
- Reign: 1770–1802
- Predecessor: Position established
- Successor: Tun Muhammad
- Born: 1718
- Died: 1802 (aged 84); Pekan
- Burial: Royal cemetery, Kuala Pahang
- Spouse: Tun Inah; Bugis Princess of Endau
- Issue: Tun Mutalib; Tun Muhammad; Tun Da Yusuf; Tun Koris; Tun Khatijah; Tun Selamah; Tun Mas Dewi
- House: Bendahara dynasty
- Father: Tun Abbas
- Religion: Sunni Islam

Sri Paduka Dato' Bendahara Paduka Raja Tun Abdul Majid ibni Almarhum Dato' Bendahara Sri Maharaja Tun Abbas, (1718–1802) was the 21st bendahara of the Johor Sultanate, who was believed by historians to be the first raja bendahara of the Pahang Kingdom that gained effective control over the principality, following the gradual dissolution of the Johor by the end of the 18th century.

== Bendahara rule in Pahang ==
Little is known about Pahang in the 18th-century except that it formed part of the Johor Sultanate and was established as the seat of power for the bendahara of the sultanate.

In the war against the pretender from Siak, Raja Kecil, the chieftains of Pahang supported Sultan Abdul Jalil Shah IV. The Bugis allies that helped restoring Bendahara dynasty rule began dominating Johorean politics shortly after the defeat of Raja Kecil. In the latter half of the century, the Bendahara in Pahang grew tired the Bugis and petitioned both the Dutch and English to help him drive them out of Riau.

In the same century, Pahang became the special province of the bendaharas. The first bendahara that effectively governing the principality was Tun Abdul Majid who was elevated to the position around 1770. The allegiance of the bendahara to the sultan, continued, though it weakened over time.

The potentate, as the senior chief, had the privilege of installing the sultan, and was himself installed by sultans. The bendahara became the sovereign ruler of Pahang, with the powers of a sultan.

== Treaty with the Dutch and peace settlement in Riau ==
On December 12, 1757, Tun Abdul Majid a signatory of the treaty during the reign of Mahmud Shah III which surrendered Rembau and Linggi to the Dutch, in return to their assistance against the Bugis faction.

After the Dutch had expelled the Bugis from Riau in 1784, the island had been occupied by Tengku Muda as Yamtuan Muda. When the English lifted the ban on the Bugis, Raja Ali returned to reclaim his position of Yamtuan Muda. Tengku Muda retorted by blockading Riau in May 1801. Bendahara Abdul Majid who was summoned from Pahang to effect settlement could, at first, do nothing. However, in February 1802, he managed to persuade the warring chiefs to go to Lingga where Mahmud Shah III made peace between the Malays and Bugis. In December 1804, Mahmud Shah III settled Raja Ali at Pulau Penyengat as Yamtuan Muda.

== Assassination of Tun Mutalib ==
Tun Abdul Majid had four sons, Tun Mutalib who resided at Pekan Sebrang, Tun Muhammad (styled 'Engku Sentul') who lived at Chenor, Tun Koris who resided with his Bugis mother at Endau, and Tun Da Yusuf whose home was in Pedah.

On one occasion, when the Bendahara's eldest son was on a visit to Riau, the Sultan showed special favour to Tun Mutalib by inviting him to be his guest at table. The custom was that the son of the Bendahara to whom the Sultan paid that honour was tacitly recognized as Bendahara designate (Bendahara Muda). In the same way, a Temenggong's son so honoured was recognized as successor to his father. Temenggong Abdul Jamal, whose two sons were present but had received no such invitation, became jealous of his nephew.

Some time afterwards, while the Sultan, accompanied by the Temenggong, was on a visit to Pahang, Abdul Jamal, broke into the Bendahara's house, concealed himself behind a door, and as Tun Mutalib was passing, stabbed him to death. Abdul Jamal fled to Padang Buloh. A search party went in pursuit, captured him and handed him over to Abdul Majid.

Tun Koris arrived and attempted to kill Abdul Jamal but was restrained by his father, citing that the Temenggong was a relative and a mad man. The Sultan ordered Abdul Jamal to be sent back to Riau. At Riau, the crazy Abdul Jamal solved the difficulties of his position by taking a lit torch into the hold where the gunpowder was stored. He and his two sons were killed in the explosion which followed.

== Succession ==
In the meantime, when the news of his brother's murder reached him, Tun Muhammad of Chenor hurried to Pekan with forty spearmen. At Pekan, he found that Abdul Jamal had left for Riau. In spite of his father's attempt to restrain him, he followed the Temenggong. On his arrival at Riau he found that the Abdul Jamal was dead. Tun Muhammad settled at Riau, and when his father, Abdul Majid died at Pekan in 1802, the Sultan installed him as the next bendahara.

== Controversy over his ancestry ==
There was a controversy whether Temenggong Tun Mutahir or Bendahara Tun Abbas, both are sons of Abdul Jalil Shah IV, was the father of Tun Abdul Majid from whom the Pahang Sultans descend. One writer, the author of the Hikayat Negeri Pahang, wrote about Abdul Majid whilst ignoring all mentions of his chief ancestors. With current evidence it is likely that Abdul Majid's father was Tun Abbas, the 18th bendahara of Johor.

== Bibliography ==
- Linehan, William (1973), History of Pahang, Malaysian Branch Of The Royal Asiatic Society, Kuala Lumpur, ISBN 978-0710-101-37-2

Tun Abdul Majid of Pahang Bendahara dynasty Born: 1718 Died: 1802
Regnal titles
Preceded by Position established	Raja Bendahara of Pahang; 1770-1802	Succeeded by Tun Muhammad
