= House of Bendahara =

Malaysian dynasty

House of Bendahara Wangsa Bendahara: وڠسا بندهار; Bendahara dynasty
- Royal house
- The black flag of the Bendaharas
- Parent house: al-Aydarus clan of Ba'Alawi sadah
- Country: Historical; Johor Sultanate; Pahang Kingdom; Riau-Lingga Sultanate; Current; Pahang; Terengganu
- Founded: 1699; 327 years ago
- Founder: Sultan Abdul Jalil Riayat Shah IV, Sultan of Johor
- Current head: Al-Sultan Abdullah Ri'ayatuddin Al-Mustafa Billah Shah, Sultan of Pahang
- Titles: Sultan of Johor; Tunku Mahkota of Johor (Crown Prince of Johor); Raja Muda of Johor (Deputy Crown Prince of Johor); Sultan of Pahang; Tengku Mahkota of Pahang (Crown Prince of Pahang); Tengku Muda of Pahang (Deputy Crown Prince of Pahang); Sultan of Terengganu; Yang di-Pertuan Muda of Terengganu (Crown Prince of Terengganu); Tengku Sri Setia Mahkota Raja (Terengganu) (Deputy Crown Prince of Terengganu); Maharaja of Johor; Sultan of Kesang; Sultan of Riau-Lingga; Raja Bendahara of Pahang; Bendahara of Johor; Temenggong of Johor
- Cadet branches: House of Temenggong

The House of Bendahara (Malay: Wangsa Bendahara, Jawi:وڠسا بندهار), or the Bendahara dynasty, is the current ruling dynasty of Pahang and Terengganu – constituent states of Malaysia. The royal house were of noble origin, holding the hereditary position of bendahara (the highest rank in Malay nobility) in the courts of Singapura, Malacca and Old Johor since at least the end of the 13th century.

The ascendancy of the family as a royal house began in the late 17th century, when the last ruler of Johor from the Malacca dynasty, Mahmud Shah II died without a male heir. In 1699, the reigning bendahara at that time, Tun Abdul Jalil was proclaimed Sultan Abdul Jalil Shah IV of Johor, beginning the consolidation of Bendahara rule in the sultanate, with different family members holding both the titles of sultan and bendahara, and later the title of temenggong.

At the same time, Pahang was established as the special province, with successive bendaharas ruling the state as their personal fief. In 1770, following the gradual dissolution of the Johor Empire, the state of Pahang was transformed into an autonomous kingdom under the grandson of Abdul Jalil IV, Tun Abdul Majid, whose descendants continue to rule Pahang. Another break-away state, the Riau-Lingga Sultanate was ruled by the descendants of Abdul Rahman Muazzam Shah, a great-great-grandson of Abdul Jalil IV, until its dissolution in 1911. A cadet branch, the House of Temenggong, has been ruling modern Johor, through the descendants of Temenggong Abdul Jamal, another grandson of Abdul Jalil IV.

Another branch, the royal house of Terengganu represents one of the junior male lines of the Bendahara dynasty. In 1717, Tun Zainal Abidin, the younger brother of Abdul Jalil IV established control over Terengganu with the title of Maharaja. He secured the recognition as the first sultan of the state from his nephew Sultan Sulaiman Badrul Alam Shah of Johor in 1725.

== History ==
In the classical Malacca and Johor Sultanates, a bendahara was the most important and highest administrative position, serving as the chief of all ministers. As an adviser to the sultan, a bendahara was appointed by the sultan and dismissible only by the sultan. The position is hereditary and candidates were selected from the male descendants of the Bendahara family. The most notable of the bendaharas was Tun Perak of the Malacca Sultanate, who excelled in both war and diplomacy. Another notable bendahara was Tun Sri Lanang of the Johor Sultanate who was an important figure in the compilation of the Malay Annals.

The consolidation of Bendahara rule in the Johor Empire originated in the late 17th century. When Mahmud Shah II died in 1699 without a male heir, Bendahara Tun Abdul Jalil became the next Sultan of Johor and assumed the title Abdul Jalil Shah IV. His appointment was accepted by Johorean chiefs based on the understanding that the bendaharas would succeed to the throne if the sultan died without heirs. During his reign, Pahang was established as a special province of the Bendahara family and ruled directly by the successive bendaharas of the empire.

In 1717, Zainal Abidin, the younger brother of the Abdul Jalil Shah IV, established control over Terengganu with the title of Maharaja. He secured recognition as the first Sultan of Trengganu from his nephew Sultan Sulaiman Badrul Alam Shah of Johor in 1725. Meanwhile, in Pahang, self-rule was established during the reign of Tun Abdul Majid when the state's status was changed from a tanah pegangan (provincial state) to tanah kurnia (fiefdom), thus the ruling Bendahara acquired the title Raja ('king') in Pahang. The allegiance of the raja bendahara to the sultan however, continued, though it weakened over time.

=== Breakup of the Johor Empire ===
During the reign of Mahmud Shah III, the great-grandson of Abdul Jalil IV, the Sultan's power was effectively reduced to the capital in Daik, Lingga. While the rest of the empire was administered by three powerful ministers, the Bendahara in Pahang, the Temenggong in Johor and Singapore, and the Yamtuan Muda in Riau. After the death of Mahmud Shah III, the empire became further divided when a succession dispute among his two sons, gave rise to two centers of power, one in Riau-Lingga, under Abdul Rahman Muazzam Shah who was supported by the Bugis nobility and the Dutch, and the other in the Johorean mainland, under Hussein Shah who was supported by the Temenggung family and the British.

On March 17, 1824, the Dutch and the British concluded the Anglo-Dutch Treaty, whereby it was agreed that Singapore and the peninsula should be in the British sphere of influence, with the islands south of Singapore in the Dutch sphere. The signing of the Treaty further undermined the cohesion of the Johor Empire and contributed to the emergence of Pahang, Johor and Riau-Lingga as independent states. The breakaway Riau-Lingga Sultanate would exist as a Dutch protectorate until 1911, when it was abolished by the Dutch colonial administration. In the Pahang Kingdom, the fourth raja bendahara, Tun Ali formally renounced his allegiance to the Sultan of Johor and became the independent ruler of Pahang in 1853. Meanwhile, in Johor, Hussein Shah and his son Ali were reduced to puppet monarchs and played a minimal role in the administrative affairs of the state, which gradually came under the charge of the Temenggong and the British.

In 1855, Sultan Ali ceded the sovereignty rights of Johor (except Kesang in Muar) to Temenggong Daeng Ibrahim, in exchange for a formal recognition as the "Sultan of Johor" by the British and a monthly allowance. Following the secession of Johor, Sultan Ali was granted administrative charge over Muar until his death in 1877, and in most administrative matters, was often styled as the "Sultan of Muar".

== Family tree ==
The genealogy of Bendahara family is obtained through several sources, but the most important is the Malay Annals that provide the extensive account from the era of Singapura up until Johor. The ancestry of Tun Habib Abdul Majid became highly controversial, considering his eminent role as the great ancestor of the ruling dynasties of Johor, Pahang and Terengganu. There are several sources that provide contradicting information about his ancestry, which can be found in at least four versions of genealogy.

Among the sources include the Salasilah Muar compiled by R.O Winstedt in A History of Johore (1365–1895). According to this version, the current ruling house of Bendahara are the patrilineal descendants of the Ba'Alawi Sada, an offshoot of the Banu Hashim tribe hailing from Hadhramaut, in what is now Yemen. They trace their lineage to al-Imam Ahmad al-Muhajir bin Isa ar-Rumi, a descendant of the Shia Imam Ja'far as-Sadiq; who in turn is a direct descendant of Fatimah, the daughter of Muhammad, the prophet of Islam. In the late 16th century, a descendant of the Banu Hashim clan, Sayyid Idrus, was among the earliest Arab settlers that served as religious leaders in Aceh. The Sultan of Aceh at that time persuaded Idrus to marry his daughter, and his son Sayyid Zaynal Abidin was born out of this union. Idrus's son Zaynal Abidin also became a religious leader and migrated to Johor, where he married Tun Kaishi, the granddaughter of Tun Sri Lanang by his son, Tun Jenal. It was from this union, the father of Tun Habib Abdul Majid was born.

Meanwhile, in several versions of Malay Annals, Tun Habib Abdul Majid is identified as 'Tun Habab' or 'Tun Habib' the son Tun Mad Ali, who in turn the son of Tun Sri Lanang. Tun Habib is described as still holding the title of 'Tun Pikrama' at the time the text was written. 'Tun Pikrama' is a title traditionally used for the future bendahara. This implies that Tun Habib Abdul Majid was the direct descendant of the House of Bendahara who have been traditionally inheriting the title of bendahara in the administration of Singapura, Malacca and Johor.

- B.S.M - Bendahara Seri Maharaja
- B.S.N.D - Bendahara Seri Nara Diraja
- B.S.R - Bendahara Sewa Raja
- B.P.R - Bendahara Paduka Raja
- B.P.T - Bendahara Paduka Tuan
- B.P.M - Bendahara Paduka Maharaja
- T.P.T - Temenggung Paduka Tuan
- T.S.M - Temenggung Seri Maharaja
- T.P.R - Temenggung Paduka Raja

House of Bendahara

Singapura
Sri Tri Buana^{(1)} r. 1299–1347
Sri Wikrama; Wira^{(2)} r. 1347–1362	Tun Perpatih; Pramuka; Berjajar; Bendahara of Singapura^{(1)}
Sri Rana; Wikrama^{(3)} r. 1362–1375
Sri Maharaja^{(4)} r. 1375–1389
Melaka
Iskandar; Parameswara^{(5)} r. 1389–1398; Melaka^{(1)} r. 1400–1414	Tun Perpatih; Tulus; Bendahara of Singapura^{(2)} Bendahara of Melaka^{(1)}	Tun Perpatih; Besar; Sri Nara; Diraja
Megat; Iskandar^{(2)} r. 1414–1424	Mani Purindan	♀ Tun Ratna; Sendari
Radin Bagus	♀ Putri Rokan	Muhammad^{(3)} r. 1424–1444	♀ Tun Ratna; Wati	Radin Anum; B.S.A.D^{(2)}
Abu Syahid^{(4)} r. 1444–1446	Muzaffar^{(5)} r. 1446–1459	♀ Raja Tua	Tun Perpatih; Sedang; B.S.R^{(3)} r. 1444–1445
♀ Wanang Seri; Lela Wangsa	Mansur^{(6)} r. 1459–1477	♀ Tun Putih; Nur Polam	Tun Ali; B.S.N.D^{(4)} r. 1445–1456	♀ Tun Kudu	Tun Perak; B.P.R^{(5)} r. 1456–1498	Tun Perpatih; Putih; B.P.R^{(6)} r. 1498–1500
House of Melaka-Pahang	House of Kelantan	Alauddin I^{(7)} r. 1477–1488	♀ Tun Senaja	Tun Mutahir; B.S.M^{(7)} r. 1500–1510	Tun Tahir	Tun Pikrama (Tepok); B.P.T^{(8)} r. 1510–1511
Bendahara of Johor
♀ Raja Putri; Fatima Puteh	♀ Raja Wati	♀ Onang Kening	Mahmud^{(8)} r. 1488–1511	♀ Tun Fatimah	Tun Hassan; Temenggung	Tun Khoja; Ahmad; B.P.R^{(1)} r. 1513–1520
House of Siak-Perak	Ahmad^{(9)} r. 1511–1513	Muzaffar I Perak r. 1528–1549	Alauddin II; Johor r. 1528–1564	Tun Mat Ali	Tun Isap; Barakah; B.P.T^{(2)} r. 1520–?
House of Melaka-Perak	House of Melaka-Johor
Tun Jenal	Tun Mahmud; B.T.N.W^{(3)}	♀ Daughter	Tun Biajid; B.S.M^{(4)}
Tun Isap Misai; B.S.M^{(5)} r. ?–1571
♀ Tun Genggang	Tun Ahmad; B.P.R^{(6)} r. 1571–1586
Tun Sri Lanang; B.P.R^{(7)} r. 1586–1615
Tun Anum; B.S.M^{(8)} r. 1615–?	Tun Jenal; B.P.R^{(9)} r. ?–1642	Tun Mad Ali; B.P.R^{(10)} r. 1642–?
Tun Rantau; B.S.M^{(11)} r. ?–1675	Tun Habib; Abdul Majid; B.S.M^{(12)} r. 1677–1697
Johor Sultanate	Terengganu; Sultanate
Abdul; Jalil IV; B.P.R^{(13)} r. 1697–1699; Sultan^{(10)} r. 1699–1718	Tun; Mas Anum; B.S.M^{(14)} r. 1699–1717	Tun; Abdullah; B.P.R^{(15)} r. 1717	Tun; Abdul Jamal; B.S.M^{(16)} r. 1717	Tun; Tahir; T.P.R r. 1722–1750	Zainal; Abidin I^{(1)} r. 1725–1733
Sulaiman^{(11)} r. 1722–1760	Tun; Abbas; B.S.M r. 1721	Tun; Husain; B.P.R r. 1721–1748	Mansur I^{(2)} r. 1733–1794
Pahang Kingdom	House of Temenggong
Abdul Jalil V^{(12)} r. 1760–1761	Tun; Hassan; B.S.M r. 1748–1770	Tun; Abdul Majid; B.P.R^{(1)} r. 1770–1802	Tun; Abdul Jamal; T.P.R r. 1757–1802	Zainal; Abidin II^{(3)} r. 1794–1808	Tengku; Muhammad; Kelantan r. 1794–1800
Ahmad^{(13)} r. 1761–1770	Mahmud III^{(14)} r. 1761–1812	Tun; Muhammad; B.S.M^{(2)} r. 1802–1803	Tun; Koris; B.P.R^{(3)} r. 1803–1806	Tun; Abdul Hamid; T.S.M r. 1803–1806	Ahmad I^{(4)} r. 1808–1830	Abdul; Rahman^{(5)} r. 1830	Mansur II^{(7)} r. 1831–1837
Riau-Lingga; Sultanate
Abdul; Rahman^{(1)} r. 1812–1819	Hussein^{(15)} r. 1819–1835	Tun Ali; B.S.M^{(4)} r. 1806–1847	Ungku; Abdul Rahman; T.S.M r. 1806–1825	Daud^{(6)} r. 1831	Omar^{(9)} r. 1831 r. 1839–1876	Tengku; Mahmud	Muhammad I^{(8)} r. 1837–1839
Muhammad^{(2)} r. 1832–1841	Tun; Haji Abdullah; T.S.M r. 1825–1841	Tun; Daeng Ibrahim; T.S.M r. 1841–1862	Ahmad II^{(10)} r. 1876–1881
Pahang; Sultanate	Modern; Johor
Sulaiman II^{(4)} r. 1857–1883	Mahmud IV^{(3)} r. 1841–1857	Ali^{(16)} r. 1835–1855	Tun Mutahir; B.S.M^{(5)} r. 1847–1863	Ahmad; B.S.M^{(6)} r. 1863–1881; Sultan^{(1)} r. 1881–1914	Abu Bakar; T.S.M r. 1862–1868; Maharaja r. 1868–1886; Sultan^{(1)} r. 1886–1895	Zainal; Abidin III^{(11)} r. 1881–1918
Abdullah^{(3)} r. 1917–1932	Mahmud^{(2)} r. 1914–1917	Ibrahim^{(2)} r. 1895–1959
Abu Bakar^{(4)} r. 1932–1974	Ismail^{(3)} r. 1959–1981	Muhammad II^{(12)} r. 1918–1920	Sulaiman I^{(13)} r. 1920–1942	Ismail^{(15)} r. 1945–1979; Agong IV r. 1965–1970
♀ Tengku Afzan	Ahmad^{(5)} r. 1974–2019; Agong VII r. 1979–1984	Iskandar^{(4)} r. 1981–2010; Agong VIII r. 1984–1989	Ali^{(14)} r. 1942–1945	Mahmud^{(16)} r. 1979–1998
Abdullah^{(6)} r. 2019–present Agong XVI r. 2019–2024	Tunku; Azizah	Ibrahim Ismail^{(5)} r. 2010–present Agong XVII r. 2024–present	Mizan^{(17)} r. 1998–present Agong XIII r. 2006–2011
Tengku; Hassanal; Ibrahim	Tunku; Ismail Idris	Tengku; Muhammad; Ismail

== Bibliography ==
- Abdul Samad Ahmad (1979), Sulalatus Salatin, Dewan Bahasa dan Pustaka, ISBN 978-983-62-5601-0, archived from the original on 12 October 2013
- Ahmad Jelani Halimi (2008), Sejarah Dan Tamadun Bangsa Melayu ('History and the Civilisation of Malay people'), Kuala Lumpur: Utusan Publication & Distributors, ISBN 978-9-6761-2155-4
- Ahmad Sarji Abdul Hamid (2011), The Encyclopedia of Malaysia, vol. 16 - The Rulers of Malaysia, Editions Didier Millet, ISBN 978-981-3018-54-9
- Andaya, Barbara Watson; Andaya, Leonard Yuzon (1984), A History of Malaysia, London: Palgrave Macmillan, ISBN 978-0-312-38121-9
- Ahmat Adam (2016), Sulalat u's-Salatin, yakni per[tu]turan segala raja-raja, dialih aksara dan disunting dengan kritis, serta diberi anotasi dan Pengenalan (Sulalat u's-Salatin, that is the genealogy of kings, transliterated and critically edited, with annotations and introductions), Yayasan Karyawan, ISBN 978-9-8395-1023-2
- Barnard, Timothy P. (2004), Contesting Malayness: Malay identity across boundaries, Singapore: Singapore University press, ISBN 9971-69-279-1
- Benjamin, Geoffrey, Issues in the Ethnohistory of Pahang, Lembaga Muzium Negeri Pahang (Museum Authority of Pahang)
- Buyong Adil (1980), Sejarah Johor (History of Johor), Dewan Bahasa dan Pustaka
- Hood Salleh (2011), The Encyclopedia of Malaysia, vol. 12 - Peoples and Traditions, Editions Didier Millet, ISBN 978-981-3018-53-2
- Linehan, William (1973), History of Pahang, Malaysian Branch Of The Royal Asiatic Society, Kuala Lumpur, ISBN 978-0710-101-37-2
- Milner, Anthony (2010), The Malays (The Peoples of South-East Asia and the Pacific), Wiley-Blackwell, ISBN 978-1444-339-03-1
- (Tun) Suzana (Tun) Othman (2002), Institusi Bendahara: Permata Melayu yang Hilang: Dinasti Bendahara Johor-Pahang (The Bendahara Institution: The Lost Malay Jewel: The Dynasty of Bendahara of Johor-Pahang), Pustaka BSM Enterprise, ISBN 983-40566-6-4
- Ooi, Keat Gin (2009), Historical Dictionary of Malaysia, Kuala Lumpur: Scarecrow Press, ISBN 978-0-8108-5955-5
- Pejabat D.Y.M.M. Paduka Seri Sultan Perak (2021), Senarai Sultan Perak ('List of Sultans of Perak')
- Tun Suzana Tun Othman; Hj Muzaffar Dato' Hj Mohamad (2006), Ahlul-Bait (keluarga) Rasulullah SAW & Kesultanan Melayu, Kuala Lumpur: Crescent News, ISBN 978-9-8330-2012-6
- Suzana Haji Othman (2018), Sejarah Pergolakan dan Pergelutan Bendahara Johor-Pahang 1613-1863 (A History of Conflicts and Struggles of Bendahara of Johor-Pahang 1613-1863)), Dewan Bahasa Pustaka, ISBN 978-9-8346-1153-8
- Trocki, Carl A. (2007), Prince of Pirates: The Temenggongs and the Development of Johor and Singapore, 1784-1885, National University of Singapore Press, ISBN 978-997-1693-76-3
- Yusoff Iskandar; Aruna Gopinath (1992), Tradisi Persejarahan Pahang Darul Makmur, 1800-1930 (Historisation tradition of Pahang Darul Makmur, 1800-1930), Tempo Publications (M), ISBN 978-9-6721-6590-3
