= Tun Mutahir of Pahang =

Bendahara of the Pahang Kingdom

Tun Mutahir تون مطاهر
- Raja Bendahara of Pahang
- Reign: 1858–1863
- Predecessor: Tun Ali
- Successor: Tun Ahmad
- Born: 1813
- Died: 30 May 1863 (aged 50) near Kuala Sedili
- Burial: Bukit Timbalan, Johor Bahru
- Spouse: 1. Tengku Kechil binti al-Marhum Sultan ‘Abdu’l-Rahman Mu’azzam Shah; 2. Tunku Chik binti al-Marhum Sultan Ahmad Tajuddin Halim Shah II
- House: Bendahara
- Father: Tun Ali
- Mother: Encik Wan Ngah
- Religion: Sunni Islam

Sri Paduka Dato' Bendahara Sri Maharaja Tun Muhammad Tahir ibni Almarhum Dato' Bendahara Sri Maharaja Tun Ali (1813–30 May 1863) was the fifth Raja Bendahara of the Pahang Kingdom who ruled the state until his death in 1863 in the Pahang Civil War.

== Early life ==
He was born in 1813. His father was Tun Ali, Bendahara Siwa Raja, and his mother was Encik Wan Ngah of the Bendahara family. He was privately educated as was the custom of the nobility then. In 1832, he was proclaimed as Bendahara Muda (Bendahara in waiting) in a ceremony in Lingga, then capital of the Johor Sultanate. He had three wives: Tengku Kechik, daughter of Sultan Abdul Rahman Muazzam Shah I of Johor; Tengku Chik, daughter of Sultan Ahmad Tajuddin Halim Shah II of Kedah; and Tengku Chik, daughter of Sultan Muhammad of Johor.

== Bendaharaship and civil war ==
Tun Ali entered into a semi-retirement in 1847 and handed the reins to Tun Mutahir. During the period when the latter followed the policy of Tun Ali, not much is written about his reign. In 1857 Tun Ali ordered the execution of Tun Ahmad, his son by another wife, Chik Puan Lingga, whom he married in 1832.

Tun Ahmad immediately fled to UK-held Singapore, and returned to Pahang when Tun Ali died. Conflict broke out between Ahmad and Tun Mutahir, which became a civil war that engulfed Pahang. This conflict not only involved the Pahang princes but also the Temenggung and the Terengganu Sultan of Johor; while the British played a political role. The war was the most decisive in the history of the Johor Sultanate. The conflict ended when Tun Mutahir was mortally wounded in 1863.

== Aftermath of civil war ==
Tun Mutahir was buried in Bukit Timbalan, Johor Bahru, Johor. Tun Ahmad had no interest in continuing as the Bendahara of Johor. He was proclaimed as Sultan Ahmad I in 1882 and founded the modern Pahang Sultanate, which sealed the breakup of the Johor Sultanate. The Maharajah of Johor Abu Bakar was given recognition by the British and proclaimed the Sultan of Johor three years later.

== Notes ==
Tun Mutahir of Pahang Bendahara Dynasty Born: 1813 Died: 1863
Regnal titles
Preceded by Tun Ali	Raja Bendahara of Pahang; 1858-1863	Succeeded by Tun Ahmad
