= Tun Ali of Pahang =

Bendahara of the Pahang Kingdom

Tun Ali تون علي
- Raja Bendahara of Pahang
- Reign: 1806–1857
- Predecessor: Tun Koris
- Successor: Tun Mutahir
- Born: c. 1782
- Died: October 1858 (aged 76)
- Burial: Royal Cemetery, Kuala Pahang
- House: Bendahara dynasty
- Father: Tun Koris
- Mother: Che Puan Tun Mariam
- Religion: Sunni Islam

Sri Paduka Dato' Bendahara Sri Maharaja Tun Ali ibni Almarhum Dato' Bendahara Paduka Raja Tun Koris (c. 1782 – October 1858) was the 23rd and the last bendahara of the Johor Sultanate, and the fourth raja bendahara of the Pahang Kingdom reigning from 1806 to 1857.

In 1853, Tun Ali declared his autonomy from the sultanate, paving the way for an independent Pahang, after two centuries of union with the crown of Johor. He was able to maintain peace and stability during his reign, but his death in 1857 precipitated a civil war between his sons.

== Bendaharaship ==
Tun Ali was the second son of the 21st bendahara of Johor Tun Koris on whose death he was installed by Sultan Mahmud Shah III of Johor in 1806. He was about 25 years of age at the time of his accession.

The Johor Sultanate at that time was approaching its dismemberment, with the sultan's power effectively reduced to the capital in Daik, Lingga. The rest of the Johor Sultanate was administered by three powerful ministers, the Bendahara in Pahang, the Temenggong in Johor and Singapore, and the Yamtuan Muda in Riau.

== Succession dispute and the two Sultans ==
In January 1812, Mahmud Shah III died, leaving two sons Tengku Hussein and Tengku Abdul Rahman. The Bugis Yamtuan Muda supported the claim of Abdul Rahman to the sultanate, and succeeded in having him proclaimed ruler at Mahmud's grave-side.

Hussein reluctantly accepted his brother's elevation to the throne, and went to Pahang where he enlisted the support of Bendahara Tun Ali who, with Hussein's step-mother Tengku Puteri Hamidah of Pulau Penyengat, who had in her custody the regalia of the Johor Sultanate, assembled forces to attack Abdul Rahman. The Yamtuan Muda, alarmed at the war-like preparations, made a complaint to the Resident of Malacca, and Adrian Koek was sent to warn the Bendahara that intervention in Lingga would give offence to the British Empire, so Tun Ali took his forces – which had been mobilized at Bulang – back to Pahang.

The British, after the restoration of Malacca to the Dutch in 1818, sought a station to off-set their European rivals in the Malay Peninsula. In 1819, Stamford Raffles induced Hussein to conclude a treaty, to which the Temenggong of Johor, Temenggong Abdul Rahman, was also a signatory, ceding Singapore to British. In return, Raffles would install Hussein as Sultan of Johor. According to the Hikayat Johor serta Pahang, Raffles desired to make Temenggong Abdul Rahman as Sultan, but Abdul Rahman said "I cannot be made ruler because I am only the third; first comes my elder brother in Pahang, second is the Yamtuan Muda at Riau, and their sovereign is at Daik."

On the Temenggong's suggestion, Tengku Hussein was summoned to Singapore and installed as sultan. The Temenggong then wrote to the Bendahara explaining what had happened. Tun Ali replied that he did not propose to take any part in the proceedings, that his allegiance was still to Daik, and that, as far as Pahangese affairs were concerned, he would ignore the new sultan in Singapore and refer to Daik.

Bendahara Tun Ali further wrote a letter to Jan Samuel Timmerman Thijssen, Governor of Malacca, expressing his amazement that God had parted brother from brother, father from son, and friend from friend, and cryptically declared his intention of being a friend to the friends of the Sultan of Johor. The seal used by the diplomatic Tun Ali described him as the representative of Mahmud Shah III, a description that would offend nobody. In the same year, the Bendahara refused to allow the British to hoist the Union Jack in his country, and assured Sultan Abdul Rahman of his allegiance, but he was soon to acknowledge Hussein. In 1821, Abdul Rahman with his son Tengku Besar Muhamad, visited Pahang whence Bendahara Tun Ali escorted his sovereign to Terengganu.

Jan Samuel Timmerman Thijssen took the regalia of the Johor Sultanate by force from Tengku Puteri Hamidah at Pulau Penyengat in October 1822. Sultan Abdul Rahman, after his return from Pahang and Terengganu around the same time was invested with the regalia at Lingga. The Bendahara appointed the Yamtuan Muda to represent him at the Sultan's investiture.

== Anglo-Dutch Treaty ==
On March 17, 1824, the Dutch and the British concluded the Anglo-Dutch Treaty, whereby it was agreed that Singapore and the peninsula should be in the British sphere of influence, while the Dutch islands south of Singapore should be in the Dutch sphere of influence.

The signing of the treaty further undermined the cohesion of Johorean-held Pahang and Riau-Lingga which contributed to the emergence of Pahang and Johor as independent states. Johor became irrevocably divided when a succession dispute gave rise to two centres of power, one in Riau-Lingga (under Abdul Rahman Muazzam Shah, r. 1812–1832) and the other on the Johorean mainland (under Hussein Shah, r. 1819–1835).

== Visit to the capital ==
Sultan Abdul Rahman died in 1832 and was succeeded by his son, Tengku Besar, who was entitled Sultan Muhammad Shah. The new ruler visited Pahang, and too Bendahara Tun Ali to Lingga for the circumcision and installation of his son Tengku Besar Mahmud. The Hikayat Pahang describes the Pahangese magnate's visit in details. He brought a many people with him, including his two chief hulubalang, Dato' Parit, a chief of Bukit Sagumpal, and Dato' Tanggok Bingkal Tembaga. On his arrival, he went into the Sultan's presence and uttered the sayings prescribed by custom and the Sharia law on such occasions; and the ruler commanded that Lingga should be temporarily under the Bendahara in accordance with custom. With Tun Ali, were present the Yamtuan Muda, the Temenggong, and other chiefs.

After the installation of Tengku Besar Mahmud was accomplished, Tun Mutahir, eldest son of Bendahara Tun Ali, was made Engku Muda, and married Tengku Chik, the Sultan's daughter. Soon after the Pahangese potentate and his people returned to their country.

On May 23, 1836, Che Lingga wife of Bendahara Tun Ali gave birth to a son Tun Ahmad, for whom an Arab merchant, Habib Abdullah ibni Omar Al-Attas, foretold a great future. Tun Ahmad was his father's favourite son and a favourite with the people.

== Administration ==
Bendahara Tun Ali was popular with his subjects. He enjoyed the advantage, of having no surviving uncles, and only one brother, Muhammad with whom he lived in friendly terms, and so had no familial threats to counter. He maintained amicable relations with the Straits Government, and availed himself of the trade facilities with Singapore. He exterminated a Bugis piratical settlement, which had been established at Keratong in the river Rompin. As a senior potentate of the Johor, he had taken a major part in the installation of the Sultan, but there were no longer any practical calls upon the ancient loyalty as the Anglo-Dutch Treaty, and the creation of separate sultans of Singapore and of Lingga had, in effect, dismembered the Malay state. Not threatened by potential rivals, he effectively controlled his chiefs over whom he ruled in the name of the Sultan.

Tun Ali's four senior nobles were Orang Kaya Indera Maharaja Perba of Jelai, the Orang Kaya Indera Segara of Temerloh, the Orang Kaya Indera Pahlawan of Chenor, and the Orang Kaya Indera Shahbandar. The Shahbandar, living near Pekan, tended to become one of the Tun Ali's ministers. Tun Ali's chief minister was his son in law Saiyid Omar or Engku Saiyid. At that time in Pahang, there were a Mufti and a Chief Qadi, Tuan Haji Abdul Shukor and Tuan Senggang as well as many religious teachers of minor degree. They interviewed Tun Ali on a daily basis and expounded to him the precepts of Islam.

Tun Ali's other son, Tun Buang (Wan Ismail), was made Engku Panglima Besar, a title that dates at least as far back as the early part of the 17th century. His grandson, Tun Long (Wan Koris), eldest son of Tun Mutahir was made Panglima Perang, another grandson Tun Aman (Wan Abdul Rahman, second son of Tun Mutahir) of Kampung Masjid, and Wan Sulaiman, husband of Che Engku Teh (a daughter of Tun Muhammad) were ranked as menteri.

== Economy ==
Pahang under Tun Ali's rule was peaceful and prosperous. 20 gantang of rice cost only one dollar, and other food stuffs were equally cheap. Many people became rich and there was a great trade in gold. Pahang, with the exception of the rich tin-producing region of the river Kuantan which was kept as a private reserve by the Tun Ali, was free from import and export duties.

== Declaration of independence ==
Despite ruling Pahang as an independent fief, Tun Ali still recognised the sultan that resided in Daik, Lingga, now under Dutch control, as his overlord. In 1844, in a warrant issued to the headman (Jenang) of the aboriginal tribes (suku biduanda) in the region of the river Anak Endau, Tun Ali described himself as "The representative of Sultan Mahmud Shah V, Dato' Bendahara Sri Wak Raja, son of the Bendahara Paduka Raja, Date 1221 (AH)".

The Bendahara ruled nominally as vice-regents up to 1853. In that year, it appeared that Bendahara Tun Ali declared himself the independent ruler of Pahang, but the friction of the suzerainty of the old royal family continued in Pahang up until 1864.

== Retirement and death ==
Long before his death in 1858, Tun Ali had retired from active participation in the government of the state, and moved his residence to Lami on the river of Pahang where he spent his declining years trying in a vain to help his son reconcile with each other. On his retirement he had handed over the government to his eldest son Tun Mutahir. The heir took up his residence at Ganchong, hence the origin of the name Bendahara Ganchong by which he came to be known.

Tun Ali died in October 1858, and was buried at the Royal Cemetery, Kuala Pahang, having had five sons and six daughters. Tun Ali's death was followed by the succession dispute among his sons Tun Mutahir and Tun Ahmad, that later escalated into a full scale civil war.

== Bibliography ==
- Ahmad Sarji Abdul Hamid (2011), The Encyclopedia of Malaysia, vol. 16 - The Rulers of Malaysia, Editions Didier Millet, ISBN 978-981-3018-54-9
- Linehan, William (1973), History of Pahang, Malaysian Branch Of The Royal Asiatic Society, Kuala Lumpur, ISBN 978-0710-101-37-2

Tun Ali of Pahang Bendahara dynasty Born: 1782 Died: 1857
Regnal titles
Preceded by Tun Koris	Raja Bendahara of Pahang; 1806–1857	Succeeded by Tun Mutahir
