= Rawa people =

Ethnic group in Southeast Asia

Total population
- unknown

Regions with significant populations
- Sumatra, Peninsular Malaysia

Religion
- Islam

Related ethnic groups
- Minangkabau, Malays

The Rawa people, also known as Rao or Rau in the Minangkabau language, are an ethnic group originating in Southeast Asia. Many Rawa people migrated to Peninsular Malaysia during the 19th century.

== History ==
It is uncertain whether the Rawa people belong to the larger Minangkabau ethnic group. Fathil et al. note controversy but assert that most scholars believe the Rawas are part of the Minangkabau. Genetic analysis indicates a close relationship between the Minangkabau and Rawa peoples. Possible origins of the Rawa people include the district of Rao in Pasaman, Champa in Mainland Southeast Asia, and west of Lake Toba in North Sumatra. C. W. Watson speculated that the Rawa people who settled the Peninsular Malaysia in the 19th century were an admixture of the Indigenous people of the upper Rokan River and Kerinci settlers originally from Rawang, North Sumatra. A. C. Milner also notes a second group of Rawas people (distinguish to the Rawa people) in Jambi and Palembang, referring to this people as the 'Orang Rawa' and the West Sumatra people as the 'Orang Rau'.

By the 2nd century CE, the Rawa people were known for mining gold and tin. The Rawa people were also known as farmers, traders, and administrators. Amran Dt. Joraho suggests that there was a majority-Buddhist Rawa Kingdom in and around Lubuk Sikaping from the 12th century to the 14th century known as Negeri di atas Angin ('Country above the Wind'). After being absorbed into the Pagaruyung Kingdom, the various Rawa clans continued to be ruled by lesser kings until the 19th century.

Some Rawa men immigrated to Peninsular Malaysia in the 5th century to work in the coastal trade. More immigrated to the Malay Peninsula in the 17th century due to an increase in gold mining in Raub, Pahang, and in the 18th century due to an increase in tin mining.

Following the Dutch victory in the Padri War in the mid-1830s, many Rawa people migrated to East Sumatra and Peninsular Malaysia to escape persecution. Some may have joined Sumatrans who had migrated in previous centuries. The Rawas helped spread Islam to the Malaysian Peninsula. In Pahang, many Rawa people settled in Raub. In Perak, many Rawa people settled in Gopeng and along the tin-rich Titiwangsa Mountains after the Padri War and during the 1870s and 1880s. In Selangor, many Rawa people settled in Kalumpang due to large tin deposits and proximity to the states they were migrating from. Many Rawa people shifted from working in tin mines to rubber tree plantations when tin production declined in the late 1880s.

During the 19th century, Rawa warriors on the Malaysian Peninsula were involved in many wars as mercenaries. After many Rawa people supported Ahmed in the Pahang Civil War, the Rawa people were viewed unfavorably by other Malay peoples. Many Rawa people fought against Ahmed in later wars. Some Rawa people fled to Bernam to escape the war. Leaders of Sungai Ujong and Rembau complained to the British about oppression and robbery by Rawas in 1855, and the British viewed the Rawas as a threat to political stability. Because of this negative perception, some chose to conceal their Rawa identity.

== Geography ==
In 1978, Milner reported that approximately 40,000 Rawa people lived in West Sumatra. The Rawa community of Malaysia is concentrated in Gopeng, Perak, where there are more than 1,000 Rawa people.

== Culture ==
In the Rawa people of Gopeng, children who are learning to walk and are at least thirteen months old must complete the adat berjojak ceremony before they are allowed to walk outside of their house. This ceremony is intended to prevent illness and poor academic performance.

Many young men practice adat merantau, the tradition of leaving one's home village to gain life experience and new opportunities.

Lemang kelamai is traditionally eaten during Hari Raya. Lemang kelamai is a variant of lemang that includes palm sugar and toasted coconut.
