= Kuala Sedili =

Kuala Sedili is a village in Kota Tinggi District, Johor, Malaysia. Before 1863, Kuala Sedili was a district in Pahang.

== History ==
In 1956 Kuala Sedili was a small fishing village at the mouth of the Sedili River, and access to the port was by boat from the Kota Tinggi to Mersing Road where it crossed the river. The river is quite deep and is saline for some distance upstream.

The Public Works Department of the day (now Jalan Kerja Raya?) began building a road to access the port in 1956 and would have finished it in 1957. At that time the main village was situated on the northern bank of the river, but all later development took place on the southern bank at the road head.
