= Bendahara =

Head of the Malay nobility

Black often represents the official colour of the bendaharas.

A bendahara (Jawi: بندهار) was an important administrative position within classical Malay kingdoms comparable to a vizier prior to the European colonisation of Southeast Asia during the 19th century. A bendahara was appointed by a sultan and was a hereditary post with candidates selected from the male descendants of the bendahara. The bendahara and the sultan often shared the same lineage, and the former could at times be more powerful than the sultan.

== Tasks of the bendahara ==
The closest post which is comparable to the post of the vizier as the Malay kingdoms were Islamic kingdoms. As the bendahara was the head of the nobility, the status conferred certain responsibility. The bendahara was the backbone of the Malay Sultanate. For the ancient kingdoms of Malacca and Johor, there were many tasks and responsibilities but the primary ones were:

- coronation and installation of the sultan
- responsibility of the welfare of the sultan
- adviser to the sultan on affairs of the state based on Sharia and Adat (Prevailing norms and values)
- responsibility over royal marriages, births and funerals
- responsibility over royal succession if the sultan dies without an heir
- acting as a vicegerent if the sultan is still young
- acting on any command of the sultan.

The legitimacy of the sultan lay with the bendahara. The bendahara always consulted the other nobles before arriving at a decision. The bendahara and nobles did this for the well-being of the subjects and was essential if there were problems in the state. These tasks were more extensive than any vizier or the modern prime minister.

The involvement of the British and the Dutch in the administration of the Malay States and the subsequent independence of Malaysia and Indonesia has reduced the bendahara to a symbolic title.

== History ==
Though it is unclear when the title was first used, the Sultanate of Malacca had several influential bendaharas. The most famous is Tun Perak. Under Tun Perak's service which spanned several sultans, Malacca reached its height in the late 15th century. According to the Malay Annals and the Hikayat Hang Tuah, the bendahara secretly saved the life of Hang Tuah, a laksamana the sultan had ordered killed.

In 1612, Bendahara Tun Sri Lanang of the Sultanate of Johor was commissioned by Sultan Alauddin Riaayat Shah of Johor to compile Malay history and record it into a book. The book is known as the Malay Annals and is an important literary piece in Malay language history. In 1699, Bendahara Abdul Jalil became Sultan Abdul Jalil IV of Johor after the previous sultan, Mahmud Shah II was murdered, leaving no heir behind. After the rule of Sultan Abdul Jalil IV, the bendahara was awarded Pahang as his personal fief. Bendahara Tun Abbas and his descendants ruled Pahang continuously until Tun Mutahir, was deposed in a civil war in 1863.

The current Terengganu sultanate was founded by Sultan Zainal Abidin I of Terengganu in 1708. He was the son of Tun Habib Abdul Majid, a 17th-century bendahara of Johor.

== Bendahara of Malacca and Johor ==
- Tun Perpatih Muka Berjajar, Bendahara
- Tun Perpatih Tulus, Bendahara of Malacca
- Raden Bagus, Bendahara of Malacca
- Raden Anum, Bendahara Sri Amar DiRaja, Bendahara of Malacca
- Tun Perpatih Sedang, Bendahara Sri Wak Raja, Bendahara of Malacca
- Tun Perpatih Putih, Bendahara Paduka Tuan, Bendahara of Malacca
- Tun Perak, Bendahara Paduka Raja, Bendahara of Malacca
- Tun Mutahir, Bendahara Seri Maharaja, Bendahara of Malacca
- Tun Rosmawe, Bendahara Paduka Tuan, Bendahara of Malacca

After the fall of Malacca to the Portuguese, the Malacca Sultanate was succeeded by the Johore Sultanate.

- Tun Khoja, Bendahara Paduka Raja, Bendahara of Johore
- Tun Biajid, Bendahara Seri Maharaja, Bendahara of Johore
- Tun Mahmud, Bendahara Tun Narawangsa, Bendahara of Johore
- Tun Isap Misai, Bendahara Seri Maharaja, Bendahara of Johore
- Tun Sri Lanang, Bendahara Paduka Raja, Bendahara of Johore. He was captured by the Achenese forces and opted to remain in Acheh.

The following Bendaharas were sidelined by the palace following the rise of Laksamana Paduka Tuan:

- Tun Anum, Bendahara Seri Maharaja, Bendahara of Johore
- Tun Jenal, Bendahara Paduka Raja, Bendahara of Johore
- Tun Mat Ali, Bendahara Paduka Tuan, Bendahara of Johore
- Tun Rantau, Bendahara Seri Maharaja, Bendahara of Johore. He was captured by the Jambi forces.
- Tun Habib Abdul Majid, Bendahara Seri Maharaja, Bendahara Padang Saujana, restored the position of the Bendahara in the palace.
- Tun Abdul Jalil, Bendahara Paduka Raja, became Sultan Abdul Jalil IV of Johor, following the death of Sultan Mahmud II.
- Tun Abdullah, Bendahara Seri Maharaja, Bendahara of Johore
- Tun Abdul Jamal, Bendahara Paduka Raja, Bendahara of Johore
- Tun Abbas, Bendahara Seri Maharaja, Bendahara of Johore
- Tun Hassan, Bendahara Seri Maharaja, Bendahara of Johore
- Tun Abdul Majid, Bendahara Paduka Raja, Bendahara of Johore

After the succession of Sultan Mahmud Shah III in Johor, the Bendahara of Johor were granted Pahang as a personal fief. Thereafter the Bendahara of Johor were known as the Bendahara in Pahang. They are also known as "Raja Bendahara" for their status as the rulers of Pahang and as a vassal state of the Johore Sultanate.

=== Raja Bendahara of Pahang ===
- Tun Abdul Majid, Raja Bendahara Pahang I (1777–1802)
- Tun Muhammad, Raja Bendahara Pahang II
- Tun Koris, Bendahara Paduka Raja, Raja Bendahara Pahang III (1803–1806)
- Tun Ali, Bendahara Siwa Raja, Raja Bendahara Pahang IV (1806–1847)
- Tun Mutahir, Bendahara Seri Maharaja, Raja Bendahara Pahang V (1847–1863). He was the last reigning Raja Bendahara of Pahang. He was ousted by his brother Wan Ahmad who was later proclaimed as Sultan of Pahang after the dismemberment of the Raja Bendahara rule in Pahang.

== Bendahara in Brunei ==
In Brunei, the title of Pengiran Bendahara was given to royal family members and to serve as a significant military commander.

- Awang Pateh Berbai (until 1408) became the first bendahara of Brunei and was given title of Pengiran Bendahara. He would hold this position until his accession as Sultan of Brunei.
- Raja Sakam is known locally as a folk hero and the son of Sultan Abdul Kahar. In 1578, he led the forces of Brunei to successfully fight against the Spanish in Kota Batu during the Castilian War.
- Pengiran Seri Ratna was to be appointed as the new bendahara of the planned Spanish tributary state of Brunei during the Castilian War.
- Abdul Hakkul Mubin was the bendahara when he and his follower garroted Sultan Muhammad Ali, resulting in the Brunei Civil War.
- Muhyiddin was the bendahara installed by Sultan Abdul Hakkul Mubin, where he would later go up against during the Brunei Civil War.
- Pengiran Anak Untong was the non-gahara (pure royal lineage) son of Sultan Hussin Kamaluddin. He moved to Sabah and made his home in the "Dumpil Meruntum" region—land that his father had given him.
- Pengiran Muda Muhammad Alam was the bendahara prior to his accession to the throne in 1826.
- Pengiran Muda Hashim was the bendahara from the 1830s until his assassination in 1846.
- Pengiran Muhammad Yusuf (Usop) was the bendahara for a short period following the absence of Pengiran Muda Hashim.

Even now, the wazir class of aristocracy still goes by the title bendahara, although they now refer to it as Pengiran Bendahara Seri Maharaja Permaisuara.

- Pengiran Anak Besar Muhammad (1883–1917) was the grandson of Sultan Muhammad Kanzul Alam. He was bestowed the title in 1883 by Sultan Abdul Momin.
- Pengiran Anak Abdul Rahman (1917–1943) was the grandson of Sultan Hashim Jalilul Alam Aqamaddin. He was bestowed the title in 1947 by Sultan Muhammad Jamalul Alam II.
- Pengiran Muda Omar Ali Saifuddien (1947–1950) was the son of Sultan Muhammad Jamalul Alam II. He was bestowed the title in 1947 by his brother, Sultan Ahmad Tajuddin.
- Pengiran Anak Muhammad Yassin (1950–1952) was the grandson of Sultan Omar Ali Saifuddin II. He was bestowed the title in 1947 by Sultan Omar Ali Saifuddien III.
- Pengiran Anak Hashim (1950–1951) was the great-grandson of Sultan Hashim Jalilul Alam Aqamaddin. He was betsowed the title in 1952 by Sultan Omar Ali Saifuddien III.
- Pengiran Muda Sufri Bolkiah (1979–present) is the son of Sultan Omar Ali Saifuddien III. He was bestowed the title in 1979 by his brother, Sultan Hassanal Bolkiah.

== Modern-day usage ==
In modern Malaysia, it is typical to refer to the equivalent position as menteri besar, a title used in states that retain state monarchies. Though a bendahara's duties are similar to those of a head of government, the two terms are not interchangeable. One clear difference is in the amount of political power. In ancient times, the bendahara was typically the highest-ranking official after the sultan but the sultan retained ultimate authority. The sultan was not answerable to the bendahara.

Current titles used:

- Tengku Bendahara of Selangor
- Tengku Sharif Bendahara of Perlis
- Tengku Sri Bendahara Raja of Terengganu
- Tunku Bendahara of Kedah
- Tengku Bendahara of Kelantan
- Tengku Arif Bendahara of Pahang
- Tunku Aris Bendahara of Johor
- Bendahara Paduka Raja of Perak (1528–1770) / Raja Bendahara of Perak (1770–1958) / Bendahara Seri Maharaja of Perak (since 1958)

In Indonesia, a treasurer is commonly referred to as bendahara. In Malaysia the equivalent term for the treasurer of a small organisation is bendahari.

In the Philippines, the term bendahara was recorded by Antonio Pigafetta during the Ferdinand Magellan expedition to refer to the Prime Minister of the Rajahnate of Cebu who was the brother of Rajah Humabon, king of that Polity.

== See also ==
- Raja bendahara
- Laksamana
- Shahbandar
- Temenggung

== Bibliography ==
- R.O. Windstedt, Bendaharas and Temenggungs, Journal of Malayan Branch of Royal Asiatic Society, Vol X part I, 1932
- R.O. Windstedt, Early Rulers of Perak, Pahang and Acheh, Journal of Malayan Branch of Royal Asiatic Society, Vol X part I, 1932
- R.O. Windstedt, A History of Johore, Journal of Malayan Branch of Royal Asiatic Society, Vol X part III, 1932
- (Tun) Suzana (Tun) Othman, Institusi Bendahara; Permata Melayu yang hilang, 2002, ISBN 983-40566-6-4
- (Tun) Suzana (Tun) Othman, Tun Seri Lanang: Sejarah dan Warisan Tokoh Melayu Tradisional, 2008, ISBN 978-983-43485-6-4
- (Tun) Suzana (Tun) Othman, Perang bendahara Pahang, 1857-63: pensejarahan semula menelusi peranan British, 2007, ISBN 978-983-195-282-5
