= Raja Bendahara of Pahang =

Malay title of monarch ruler

- Black often represents the official colour of the bendaharas.
- Creation date: 1770
- Creation: Pahang Kingdom
- Created by: Mahmud Shah III of Johor
- First holder: Tun Abdul Majid of Pahang
- Last holder: Ahmad al-Muadzam Shah of Pahang
- Status: extinct
- Extinction date: 8 August 1881
- Former seat: Istana Ganchong

Raja Bendahara of Pahang (Malay: Raja Bendahara; Jawi: راج بندهار) was a Malay title for the monarch of the Pahang Kingdom that existed from 1770 to 1881. The title is a combination of the Sanskrit word raja ('king') and bendahara ('grand vizier'). The successive bendaharas of the Johor Empire ruled Pahang as a fief from the late 17th century. By the end of 18th century, the Bendahara emerged as an absolute ruler over the fief, carrying the title 'Raja', following the decentralisation of Sultan's power and the dismemberment of the empire.

== Origin ==
In classical Malay kingdoms, a bendahara was the most important and highest administrative position in royal court, serving as the chief of all ministers. As a royal adviser, a bendahara was appointed by the raja, who alone could sack him. The position was hereditary and candidates were selected from the male descendants of the Bendahara family.

The transition of the bendahara into royalty began in the late 17th century, when the last ruler of Johor from the Malacca dynasty, Mahmud Shah II died without a male heir. Tun Abdul Jalil, the Bendahara of Johor, became the next Sultan of Johor, assuming the title Abdul Jalil Shah IV. During his reign, the eastern state of Pahang was established as a special province of the Bendahara family and ruled directly by the successive bendaharas of the empire. Self-rule was established during the reign of Tun Abdul Majid when the state's status was changed from a tanah pegangan (a fief) to tanah kurnia ('granted land'), thus the ruling bendahara acquired the title raja ('king') in Pahang, also known as raja bendahara'.

== List of Raja Bendahara of Pahang ==
Name	Jawi Name	Reignal title	Reign
Tun Abdul Majid II	تون عبد المجيد	Sri Paduka Dato' Bendahara Paduka Raja	1770–1802
Tun Muhammad II	تون محمد	Sri Paduka Dato' Bendahara Sri Maharaja	1802–1803
Tun Koris I	تون قرظ	Sri Paduka Dato’ Bendahara Paduka Raja	1803–1806
Tun Ali	تون علي	Sri Paduka Dato’ Bendahara Sewa Raja	1806–1847
Tun Muhammad Tahir II	تون محمد طاهر	Sri Paduka Dato’ Bendahara Sri Maharaja	1847–1863
Tun Ahmad	تون أحمد	Sri Paduka Dato’ Bendahara Sewa Raja	1863–1881

== Bibliography ==
- Ahmad Sarji Abdul Hamid (2011), The Encyclopedia of Malaysia, vol. 16 - The Rulers of Malaysia, Editions Didier Millet, ISBN 978-981-3018-54-9
- Linehan, William (1973), History of Pahang, Malaysian Branch Of The Royal Asiatic Society, Kuala Lumpur, ISBN 978-0710-101-37-2
- (Tun) Suzana (Tun) Othman (2002), Institusi Bendahara: Permata Melayu yang Hilang: Dinasti Bendahara Johor-Pahang (The Bendahara Institution: The Lost Malay Jewel: The Dynasty of Bendahara of Johor-Pahang), Pustaka BSM Enterprise, ISBN 983-40566-6-4
