= Mamak people =

Ethnic group in Malaysia

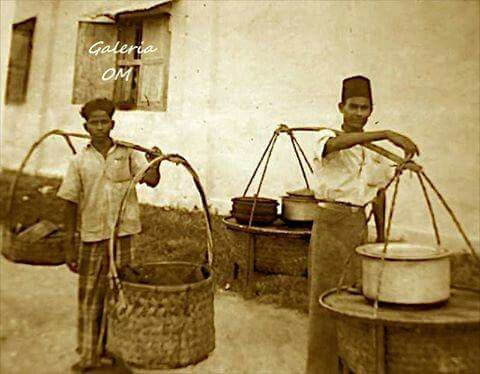
Nasi Kandar 1950s, Kuala Lumpur

The Mamak people are one of several sub‑groups that make up the populations of Malaysia and Singapore, where they are often referred to as Indian Muslims or Tamil Muslims. They are of Indian origin as they largely hail from the southern regions of India, specifically Tamil Nadu, and mostly practice Islam. The Mamak community is noted for its entrepreneurial activities—particularly its ubiquitous open‑air eateries known as "Mamak stalls"—and for its significant contributions to Malaysia's cultural, economic, and political life. Although of Indian origin, they are officially recognised—albeit sometimes controversially—as part of Malaysia’s Bumiputera community. Many Mamak‑owned enterprises have risen to become some of the nation’s largest Bumiputera corporations. Beyond gastronomy, they have long played an outsized role in commerce, politics, journalism, and philanthropy. Common Mamak surnames include Rowther (Rawther), Merican (Marikar), Kutty, Koya, Naina, Mydin although not restricted to.

Alongside the Mamak, other long-established minorities such as the Hadhrami Arabs (of Yemeni descent), who have lived in that region for four to five generations, are also recognised as Bumiputera. The Mamak, like these groups, have integrated deeply into the Malay cultural framework while maintaining their unique heritage from their ancestral culture. Notably, Mahathir Mohamad, Malaysia’s longest-serving prime minister, is himself of Mamak descent, often cited as a symbol of the community’s integration and influence. Mahathir's Indian Muslim ancestry has also featured in Malaysian political discourse. Political opponents have referred to him as "Mamak Bendahara", a term combining Mamak, commonly associated with Indian Muslims, and Bendahara, a high-ranking ministerial position in the historical Malay sultanates. In January 2011, opposition politician Azmin Ali used the expression during a debate in the Selangor State Legislative Assembly, subsequently defending it as a term derived from classical Malay usage. The expression was later employed by UMNO politician Lokman Noor Adam in criticism of Mahathir in September 2018..

The term Mamak is sometimes used more broadly to describe Muslims of Indian and Pakistani origin in Malaysia, rather than exclusively Tamil Muslims.

== History ==
=== Early settlement and the Malacca Sultanate ===
Tamil-speaking Indian Muslims established trading connections with the Malay Peninsula through maritime networks linking the Coromandel Coast of southern India with Southeast Asia. During the 15th century, Indian Muslim merchants became established in the Malacca Sultanate, where some acquired positions of influence within the royal administration. Their commercial activities and marriages into Malay aristocratic families contributed to the emergence of prominent families of mixed Tamil Muslim and Malay ancestry.

One prominent figure was Mani Purindan (also spelled Mani Purindam), an Indian Muslim merchant who, according to the Malay Annals (Sejarah Melayu), married into the family of Seri Nara Diraja during the reign of Sultan Muhammad Shah (1424–1444). Their children included Tun Ali and Tun Wati. Tun Wati married Sultan Muhammad Shah and became the mother of Raja Kassim, who subsequently ascended the throne as Sultan Muzaffar Shah. This established a direct maternal connection between the Malaccan royal dynasty and an Indian Muslim merchant family.

Tun Ali, also known as Seri Nara Diraja, became one of the most influential officials in the Malaccan court. He served as Bendahara, the Sultanate's chief minister, during the reign of Sultan Muzaffar Shah. His political influence brought him into rivalry with Tun Perak, another prominent Malay nobleman. Their dispute was eventually resolved through a marriage alliance involving Tun Kudu, the sister of Tun Perak and former wife of Sultan Muzaffar Shah, enabling Tun Perak to succeed Tun Ali as Bendahara.

Another notable figure was Tun Mutahir, the son of Tun Ali and Tun Kudu, who served as Temenggung before becoming Bendahara in 1500 under Sultan Mahmud Shah. Bearing the title Bendahara Seri Maharaja, Tun Mutahir held one of the highest offices in the Sultanate until his execution in 1510 following a political dispute with the Sultan. His daughter, Tun Fatimah, subsequently became a consort of Sultan Mahmud Shah. The circumstances surrounding Tun Mutahir's execution and its relationship to the Portuguese conquest of Malacca in 1511 have been examined and debated by historians.

Other officials identified in historical studies as having Tamil Muslim ancestry include Temenggung Tun Tahir and Temenggung Tun Hassan. Indian Muslim merchants also occupied positions in Malacca's port administration, demonstrating the community's involvement in both maritime commerce and government.

=== Historical use of the term Mamak ===
The word Mamak derives from the Tamil term māmā, meaning maternal uncle and also used for a father-in-law. Historical studies have linked its usage in the Malay royal courts to kinship relationships between Indian Muslim officials and Malay ruling families. The expressions Mamak Bendahara and Mamak Menteri appear in classical Malay literary sources, including Hikayat Hang Tuah and the Malay Annals, as forms of address associated with senior court officials. The terminology subsequently developed into a broader designation for Indian Muslims in the Malay Peninsula.

=== After the Portuguese conquest ===
Following the Portuguese conquest of Malacca in 1511, Tamil Muslim merchants increasingly extended their commercial activities and political connections to other Malay states, including Johor, Kedah and Perak, as well as Aceh. These trading networks continued to contribute to the presence of Indian Muslim communities in the Malay Peninsula during subsequent centuries.

== Economic and social contributions ==
Since the 19th century, Tamil‑Muslim entrepreneurship has had an outsized impact on Malaysia’s urban economy. In Penang, Mamak merchants once “virtually monopolized the shipping and stewarding industry”, later branching into provision stores, textile trading, jewellery, and publishing. Traditionally, the Mamak community in Malaysia has been most active in the food and beverage sector, with Mamak stalls and restaurants becoming a cultural and economic staple across the country. They are also known for their roles in retail trade, particularly in textiles, groceries, and convenience stores, as well as wholesale distribution and small-scale import-export businesses. Historically, some were involved in moneylending, especially during the colonial era, offering financial services within local communities before formal banking was widespread—though this role diminished as the financial sector formalized. The scale of Mamak economic activity has largely centered around SMEs (small and medium-sized enterprises), but a select few, like Mydin or Jakel, have grown into major corporate players. Their economic influence is distinct from that of the Hadhrami Arabs, who are more historically associated with elite merchant networks and Islamic scholarship.

A signature of their F&B sub‑segment is the nasi kandar trade—originating with roaming Tamil‑Muslim rice sellers in colonial Penang—which “has evolved into a multi‑million‑ringgit franchise business rivalling international fast‑food chains”.

Beyond food service, Mamak endowments have shaped Malaysia’s religious and cultural landscape. Tamil‑Muslim waqf patronage built at least 22 of Penang’s 67 historic mosques, including the landmark Kapitan Keling Mosque (1803). Members of the community pioneered Malay‑language journalism, founding *Jawi Peranakan* (1876) and at least 15 other titles before 1910, and remain active in consumer and environmental advocacy through bodies such as the Consumers Association of Penang (CAP).

== Notable people of Mamak ancestry ==
=== Politics and government ===
- Abdul Azeez Abdul Rahim (born 1966), former Chairman of Tabung Haji (2013-2018)
- Mahathir Mohamad (born 1925), 4th & 7th Prime Minister of Malaysia; his grandfather, Iskandar of Yemeni descent from Kerala, was a school teacher.
- Abdul Kadir Sheikh Fadzir, (born 1939), former Tourism, Arts and Culture minister (1997-2004), former Information minister (2004-2007).
- Nor Mohamed Yakcop, former Finance Minister II (2008–2013) and ex‑Governor of Bank Negara Malaysia.
- Ali Abul Hassan Sulaiman, 6th Governor of Bank Negara Malaysia (1998–2000).
- Shaik Abdul Rasheed Abdul Ghaffour, 10th Governor of Bank Negara Malaysia since 1 July 2023.
- Shahrizat Abdul Jalil, born 1953, Women, Family and Community Development minister from 2009 to 2012.
- Johan Mahmood Merican, Secretary‑General of the Treasury (since 2023) and chairman of 1MDB.
- Latheefa Koya (born 1973), lawyer and human rights activist; Chief Commissioner of the Malaysian Anti‑Corruption Commission (2019–2020).
- Ayob Khan Mydin Pitchay (born 1966), Deputy Inspector‑General of Police (since 2023).
- Zambry Abdul Kadir (born 1962), Minister of Higher Education since December 2023; former minister of foreign affairs (2022–2023) and 11th Menteri Besar of Perak (2009–2018).
- Tan Sri Dr. Ali Hamsa (1955–2022), 13th Chief Secretary to the Government of Malaysia (2012–2018); known for civil service reform and transformation.
- Tan Sri Muhammad Shafee Abdullah, high-profile lawyer; lead defence counsel for Najib Razak in the 1MDB trials and known for landmark legal cases.

=== Business and industry ===
- Habib Mohamed Abdul Latif, jeweller and founder of Habib Jewels (1958).
- Tuan Mydin Mohamed Ghulam Hussein, founder and chairman of Mydin Holdings Bhd, Malaysia’s largest Muslim‑owned retail chain.
- Mohamed Jakel Ahmad, founder of Jakel Group (1983).
- Azmir Merican, Group MD of Sime Darby Property Bhd since 2020.
- Reezal Merican Naina Merican, former Cabinet minister and current MATRADE chairman; born in Kepala Batas, Penang.
- Mohamed Rafique Merican, former Group CEO of Islamic Banking and CEO of Maybank Islamic (2016–2024).
- Syed Ali Shahul Hameed, Group CEO of Berjaya Land Berhad since March 2023; formerly Joint Group CEO of Berjaya Corporation (2022–2023).
- Dato’ Sri Mustaffa Abd Rahman, founder and CEO of AMP Corporation (M) Sdn Bhd (AMCOP), a leading provider of maritime surveillance systems in Malaysia.

=== Academia and scholarship ===
- S. M. Mohamed Idris, long‑time president of the Consumers Association of Penang and Sahabat Alam Malaysia.
- Koo Salma Nasution, researcher on Tamil Muslim (Chulia) history and culture.
- Mohd Farid Ravi Abdullah, Islamic scholar, preacher and rector of Selangor Islamic University.

=== Religion ===
- Zamri Vinoth, controversial Islamic freelance preacher.

=== Sports ===
- Syamer Kutty Abba, professional football player as midfielder for Malaysia national football team and Johor Darul Takzim F.C..

=== Arts and culture ===
- Abdul Razak Mohaideen, film director.
- Azad Jazmin John Louis bin Jefri, actor and comedian. Known by his stage name as "Azad Jasmin" and "Pak Azad".
- Faridah Merican, co‑founder of The Actors Studio and Kuala Lumpur Performing Arts Centre.
- Ibrahim Din (1929-1996), actor and comedian.
- Mohamad Ikhtiarudin bin Naina Mohamad, actor and comedian. Known by his stage name as "Mamak Puteh".
- Mohamad Zain Shariff (1921-1967), actor, singer and comedian. Known by his stage name as "M. Zain".
