= Parameswara of Malacca =

Founder of the Malacca Sultanate

Parameswara ڤارميسوارا
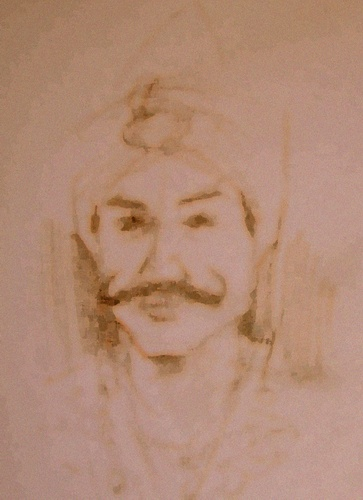

1st Sultan of Malacca
- Reign: 1402–1414
- Successor: Megat Iskandar Shah

5th Raja of Singapura
- Reign: 1389–1398
- Predecessor: Sri Maharaja
- Successor: Kingdom disestablished
- Born: 1344; Kingdom of Singapura or Palembang
- Died: 1414 (aged 70); Melaka, Malacca Sultanate
- Burial: Tanjung Tuan, Malacca or Bukit Larangan, Singapore
- Spouse: Puteri Ratna Kemala bint Sultan Zainal Abidin I Pasai
- Issue: Megat Iskandar Shah
- House: Malacca
- Father: Sri Maharaja
- Religion: Hinduism

Parameswara (1344 – c. 1414), thought to be the same person named in the Malay Annals as Iskandar Shah, was the last king of Singapura and the founder of the Malacca Sultanate. According to the Malay Annals, he ruled Singapura from 1389 to 1398. The king fled the island kingdom after a Majapahit naval invasion in 1398 and founded his new stronghold on the mouth of Bertam river (Malacca River) in 1402. Within decades, the new city grew rapidly to become the capital of the Malacca Sultanate. Portuguese accounts however, written a hundred years after his death, suggest he was from Palembang in Sumatra and usurped the throne of Singapura; he was driven out, either by Siam or Majapahit, and went on to found Malacca.

== Etymology ==
The name Parameswara is found in Portuguese sources such as Suma Oriental, and written Paramicura or Parimicura. Parameswara is a Hindu name derived from the Sanskrit word Parameśvara (Sanskrit: परमेश्वर), a concept literally meaning the "Supreme Lord". The word "parama" meaning "the supreme" is added to Ishvara as an intensifier. Parameśvara is also one of the names of Lord Shiva. However, the name Parameswara is not found in the Malay Annals, which tell a romanticized history of the kingdoms of Singapura and Malacca. It gives the name Iskandar Shah as the last ruler of Singapura and founder of Malacca. Iskandar is Persian for "Alexander", after Alexander the Great, and Shah the Persian title for a king. It has been conjectured that Iskandar Shah of the Malay Annals is the same person as Parameswara based on certain commonalities in their biographies.

The Ming Chronicle (Ming Shilu) recorded that the consort of Parameswara known as Bā-ér-mí-sū-lǐ (八兒迷蘇里) ('Parameswari') attended a banquet together with the king Bai-li-mi-su-la (拜里迷蘇剌, 'Parameswara') in the Ming court. It is more likely that 'Parameswari' ("Supreme Lordess") referred to a title rather than a given name as evidenced by its application in the Malay Annals to Sang Nila Utama's mother-in-law, Queen Parameswari Iskandar Shah, and is in fact still in use today in the form of "Permaisuri" ('Queen') in the Malay language. Therefore, the name Parameswara is also believed to be a small part of a longer regnal title which was something common among Malay royals until the present day. Apart from Parameswara the founder of Malacca, Abu Syahid Shah, the fourth Sultan of Malacca, was also titled "Raja Sri Parameswara Dewa Shah".

== Biography ==
=== Origin ===
There are differing accounts of the origin and life of Parameswara given in the Malay Annals and Portuguese sources. The Malay Annals was written during the heyday of Malacca and re-compiled in 1612 by the Johor court. It is the basis for accounts of the founding of Singapura, the succession of its rulers and its eventual decline. According to the account by the Malay Annals, Iskandar Shah (Parameswara) was a descendant of Sang Nila Utama said to have founded Singapura. However, historians cast doubts on the accuracy and historicity of the Malay Annals on its accounts of Singapura. Portuguese sources such as the Suma Oriental by Tomé Pires were written shortly after the Portuguese conquest of Malacca and they give a different account of the origin of Parameswara.

Both Suma Oriental and Malay Annals do contain similar stories about a fleeing Palembang prince arriving in Singapura and about the last king of Singapura who fled to the west coast of Malay peninsula to found Malacca. However, both accounts differ markedly on the identity of the prince: Suma Oriental identified the fleeing prince and the last king of Singapura as the same person known as "Parameswara", while the more detailed Malay Annals identified the fleeing prince and the last king as completely two different persons separated by five generations (Sang Nila Utama and Iskandar Shah). Suma Oriental noted further that the fleeing Palembang prince usurped the throne of Singapura from a Siamese viceroy named "Temagi" sometimes around the 1390s. Portuguese accounts by Tomé Pires and João de Barros, which may have been based on a Javanese source, suggest that Parameswara was a prince from Palembang who attempted to challenge Javanese rule over Palembang sometime after 1360. In this version, the Javanese attacked and drove Parameswara out of Palembang, who then escaped to Singapore. Parameswara soon assassinated the local ruler with the title Sang Aji, Sangesinga. Parameswara then ruled for five years before he was driven out. The account by Pires also indicates that Iskandar Shah was the son of Parameswara who became the second ruler of Malacca. Many scholars believe that Parameswara and Iskandar Shah are the same person, although some argued for Megat Iskandar Shah being the son of Parameswara.

The only Chinese first-hand account of 14th century Temasek (the name used before it was changed to Singapura), Dao Yi Zhi Lue written by Wang Dayuan, indicates that Temasek was ruled by a local chief (before the time of Parameswara). However the word used by Wang indicates that the ruler of Temasek was not independent, rather he was a vassal of another more powerful state.

=== Fall of Singapura ===
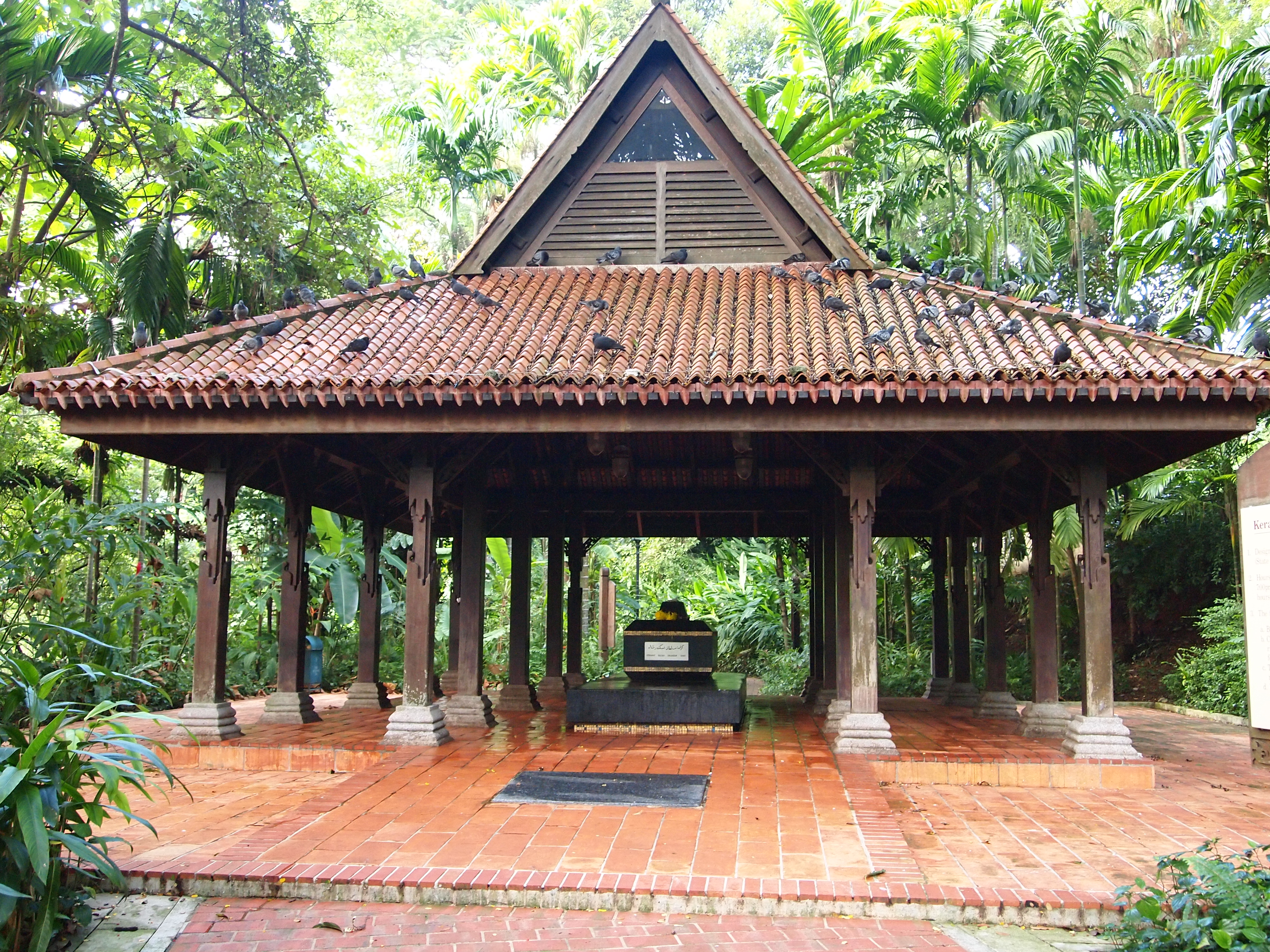
A keramat erected on Fort Canning Hill believed to memorialise Iskandar Shah, the last Raja of Singapura commonly identified with Parameswara due to commonalities in their biographies. There is no evidence that it was a tomb or that he was buried there.

Based on the account from the Malay Annals, Sri Maharaja of Singapura was succeeded by his son, Iskandar Shah, in 1389. The use of the peculiar Persian name and title in the Malay Annals may suggest that he had converted to Islam. Accounts in the Malay Annals trace back the Islamic influence in Singapura to the reign of Sri Rana Wikrama, when he first established relationships with a Sumatran Muslim Kingdom, Peureulak.

The Malay annals' account of the fall of Singapura and the flight of its last king begins with Iskandar Shah's accusation of one of his concubines of adultery. As punishment, the king had her stripped naked in public. In revenge, the concubine's father, Sang Rajuna Tapa who was also an official in Iskandar Shah's court, secretly sent a message to Wikramawardhana of Majapahit, pledging his support should the king choose to invade Singapura. In 1398, Majapahit dispatched a fleet of three hundred large ships and hundreds of smaller vessels, carrying no less than 200,000 men. Initially, the Javanese soldiers engaged with the defenders in a battle outside the fortress, before forcing them to retreat behind the walls. The invasion force laid a siege of the city and repeatedly tried to attack the fortress. However, the fortress proved to be impregnable.

After a month, food in the fortress began to run low and the defenders were on the verge of starvation. Sang Rajuna Tapa was then asked to distribute whatever grain left to the people from the royal store. Seeing this opportunity for revenge, the minister lied to the King, saying the stores were empty. The grains were not distributed and the people eventually starved. The final assault came when the gates were finally opened under the order of the treacherous minister. The Majapahit soldiers rushed into the fortress and a terrible massacre ensued. According to the Malay Annals, "blood flowed like a river" and the red stains on the laterite soil of Singapore are said to be blood from that massacre. Knowing that defeat was imminent, Iskandar Shah and his followers fled the island.

Portuguese sources gave different accounts from the Malay Annals. They suggested that Parameswara originated from Palembang, who escaped to Temasek that some believed to be a vassal of Siam. There he assassinated the local ruler who had welcomed Parameswara into the kingdom, and ruled there for five years. There are different suggestions as to who attacked Singapura. One indication was that the assassinated ruler of Temasek may be related by marriage to the Patani Kingdom and the Siamese Ayutthaya Kingdom. João de Barros said that it was the Siamese who attacked Singapura, while Brás de Albuquerque believed that it was the Pattani Kingdom. Diogo do Couto on the other hand said it was the Majapahit, while Godinho de Erédia mentioned Pahang (by which he meant most the Malay Peninsula).

=== Foundation of Malacca ===
The Coat of arms of Malacca, which depicts two mousedeer and a malacca tree as allusions to the founding legend of Malacca.

Parameswara fled north to found a new settlement. In Muar, Parameswara contemplated establishing his new kingdom at either Biawak Busuk or at Kota Buruk. Finding that the Muar location was not suitable, he continued northwards. Along the way, he reportedly visited Sening Ujong (former name of present-day city of Seremban) before reaching a fishing village at the mouth of the Bertam River (former name of the Malacca River). This evolved over time to become the location of modern-day Malacca City.

According to the Malay Annals, legend has it that the king saw a mouse deer outwitting his hunting dog into the water when he was resting under the Malacca tree. He thought this boded well, remarking, 'this place is excellent, even the mouse deer is formidable; it is best that we establish a kingdom here'. Tradition holds that he named the settlement after the tree he was leaning against while witnessing the portentous event. Today, the mouse deer is part of modern Malacca's coat of arms. The name "Malacca" itself was derived from the fruit-bearing Malacca tree (Malay: Pokok Melaka) scientifically termed as Phyllanthus emblica.

There are at least two other theories on the origin the naming of Malacca: Tomé Pires explains the name in the Suma Oriental as a transliteration of the term for a fugitive, Malaqa, reflecting Parameswara's history as one, and the Malay Annals themselves suggest that Arab merchants called the kingdom Malakat (Arabic for 'congregation of merchants') during the reign of Muhammad Shah (1424–1444), because it was home to many trading communities.

=== Reign in Malacca ===
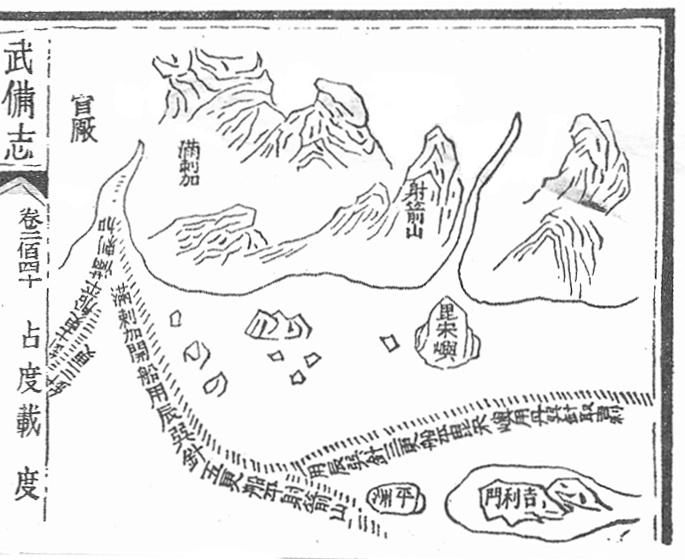
Malacca (滿剌加) as it appears in the Mao Kun map, regarded as a record of Admiral Zheng He's treasure voyages, as compiled in the Wubei Zhi

After the foundation of the new settlement in Malacca, Parameswara initiated the development of the place and ordered his men to cultivate the lands with banana, sugar cane, yam and other crops for food. Taking the advantage of the harbour that is protected by a hill and sheltered ships well from the danger of strong tides, Parameswara laid the foundation of a trading port by building the storage and market facilities to serve as a meeting point to exchange goods. The indigenous inhabitants of Malacca and the strait, the Orang Laut, who were variously known as the loyal servants of Malay rulers since the time of Singapura and Srivijaya and ferocious pirates, were said to have been employed by Parameswara to patrol the adjacent seas, to repel other petty pirates, and to direct traders to their Malay overlords' port.

Within years, news about Malacca becoming a centre of trade and commerce began to spread all over the eastern part of the world and reached as far as China. The Yongle Emperor of the Ming dynasty, who reigned from 1402 till 1424, sent his envoy known as Yin Qing to Malacca in 1405. Yin Qing's visit opened the way for the establishment of friendly relations between Malacca and China. Chinese merchants began calling at the port of Malacca, joining other foreign traders notably the Javanese, Indians, Chinese, and Burmese who came to establish their trading bases and settle in Malacca, increasing its population to almost 2000 settlers from various region during the end of Parameswara's reign.

In 1411, Parameswara, his wife, his son, and a royal party of 540 from his royal guards left for China with Admiral Zheng He to pay homage to the Yongle Ming Emperor. Yongle praised Parameswara and acknowledged him as the rightful ruler of Malacca. He then presented Parameswara with a seal, silk and a yellow umbrella as symbols of royalty and also a letter appointing Parameswara as the ruler of Malacca. Malacca was then recognised as a kingdom by the Emperor of China. The envoy returned to Malacca together with a fleet led by Zheng He.

The Chinese chronicles mention that in 1414, the son of the first ruler of Malacca visited Ming China to inform them that his father had died. It is generally believed that he was buried on top of a hill at Tanjung Tuan (also known as Cape Rachado), adjacent of the modern-day district of Port Dickson. Parameswara was succeeded by his son, Megat Iskandar Shah who in turn ruled Malacca until 1424. There is an unverified claim that Parameswara had been buried at the Keramat Iskandar Shah at Bukit Larangan Park, Singapore.

== Religious belief ==
There are significant discrepancies in Malay, Chinese and Portuguese sources on the early history of Malacca, which created considerable disagreements about the early rulers of the kingdom. While there is consensus that Parameswara was a Hindu as indicated by his Hindu name, scholars have different opinions on if and when he converted to Islam. No historical sources explicitly state that Parameswara had converted, however, the Persian moniker Iskandar Shah used in the Malay Annals, as well as the confusion as to whether Parameswara and Iskandar Shah in different sources refer to the same person, led to the conjecture that Parameswara had converted to Islam and took a new name. The 16th-century Portuguese writer Tomé Pires mentioned that Parameswara was succeeded by his son, named Chaquem Daraxa (Iskandar Shah), and that only the latter converted to Islam at the age of 72, while Ming dynasty sources also gave two different names, Parameswara and Megat Iskandar Shah. R. O. Winstedt argued that the Ming record had mistaken them as two different persons when Parameswara had merely adopted a new name after converting to Islam in 1414. George Coedes similarly states that Paramesvara converted to Islam after marrying a daughter of the king of Pasai at the old age of 72, and took the name Megat Iskandar Shah. Others suggest he converted in the year 1409 when he was sixty-five.

The Chinese History of Ming considers Megat Iskandar Shah to be the son of Parameswara, and Wang Gungwu argues that the Chinese court was unlikely to have confused Parameswara with his son when both had visited the Ming court within a few years of each other, and the chronology and other documents support Megat Iskandar Shah being a different person. Some scholars believe both Parameswara and his son were given the same title, the elder called Sri Iskandar Shah and the son Megat Iskandar Shah. This son is referred to in the Malay Annals as Raja Besar Muda, or Raja Kechil Besar / Sultan Megat in Raffles MS. According to the Malay Annals, the third king Muhammad Shah was the first Muslim ruler of Melaka, having converted after a dream. Chinese sources gave third king's name as Sri Maharaja, possibly before his conversion. Based on Malay, Portuguese, and Chinese writings, Christopher Wake concludes that Parameswara never adopted Islam but was posthumously given the title Iskandar Shah. While there are differing views on when the Islamisation of Melaka actually took place, it is generally agreed that Islam was firmly established among the general populace by the reign of Muzaffar Shah.

== Foreign relations with Ming China ==
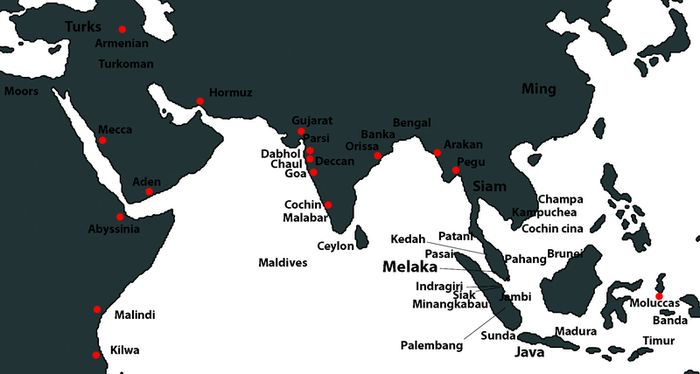
Map of 15th century Malacca and its contemporaries.

The relation with Ming China started in the early 15th century when Parameswara embarked on several voyages to visit the Yongle Emperor (r. 1402–1424). In 1403, the first official Chinese trade envoy led by Admiral Yin Qing arrived in Malacca. Later, Parameśwara was escorted by Zheng He and other envoys in his successful visits. Malacca's relationships with Ming granted protection to Malacca against attacks from Siam and Majapahit and Malacca officially submitted as a protectorate of Ming China. This encouraged the development of Malacca into a major trade settlement on the trade route between China and South Asia, West Asia, Africa and Europe.

In 1411, Parameswara and his wife together with 540 officials from Malacca went to China to pay homage to the Yongle Emperor. Upon arriving, a grand welcoming ceremony was held with sacrification of animals. The historical meeting between Parameswara and the Yongle Emperor was recorded accurately in the Ming chronicle:

You, king (refer to Parameswara), travelled tens of thousands of li across the ocean to the capital, confidently and without anxiety, as your loyalty and sincerity assured you of the protection of the spirits. I (the Yongle Emperor) have been glad to meet with you, king, and feel that you should stay. However, your people are longing for you and it is appropriate that you return to soothe them. The weather is getting colder and the winds are suited for sailing South. It is the right time. You should eat well on your journey and look after yourself, so as to reflect my feelings of concern for you. Now I am conferring upon you, king, a gold and jade belt, ceremonial insignia, two "saddled horses", 100 liang of gold, 500 liang of silver, 400,000 guan of paper money, 2,600 guan of copper cash, 300 bolts of embroidered fine silks and silk gauzes, 1,000 bolts of thin silks ...

Tributes that Malacca paid to Ming included: agate, carnelian, pearl, hawksbill, coral, crane beak, golden female crane beak, suit, white cloth, Western fabric, Sa-ha-la, rhino horn, ivory, black bear, black ape, white muntjac, turkey, parrot, pian-nao, rosebush dew, su-he oil, gardenia flower, wu-ye-ni, aromatic wood, incense sticks, gold silver incense sticks.

== Legacy ==
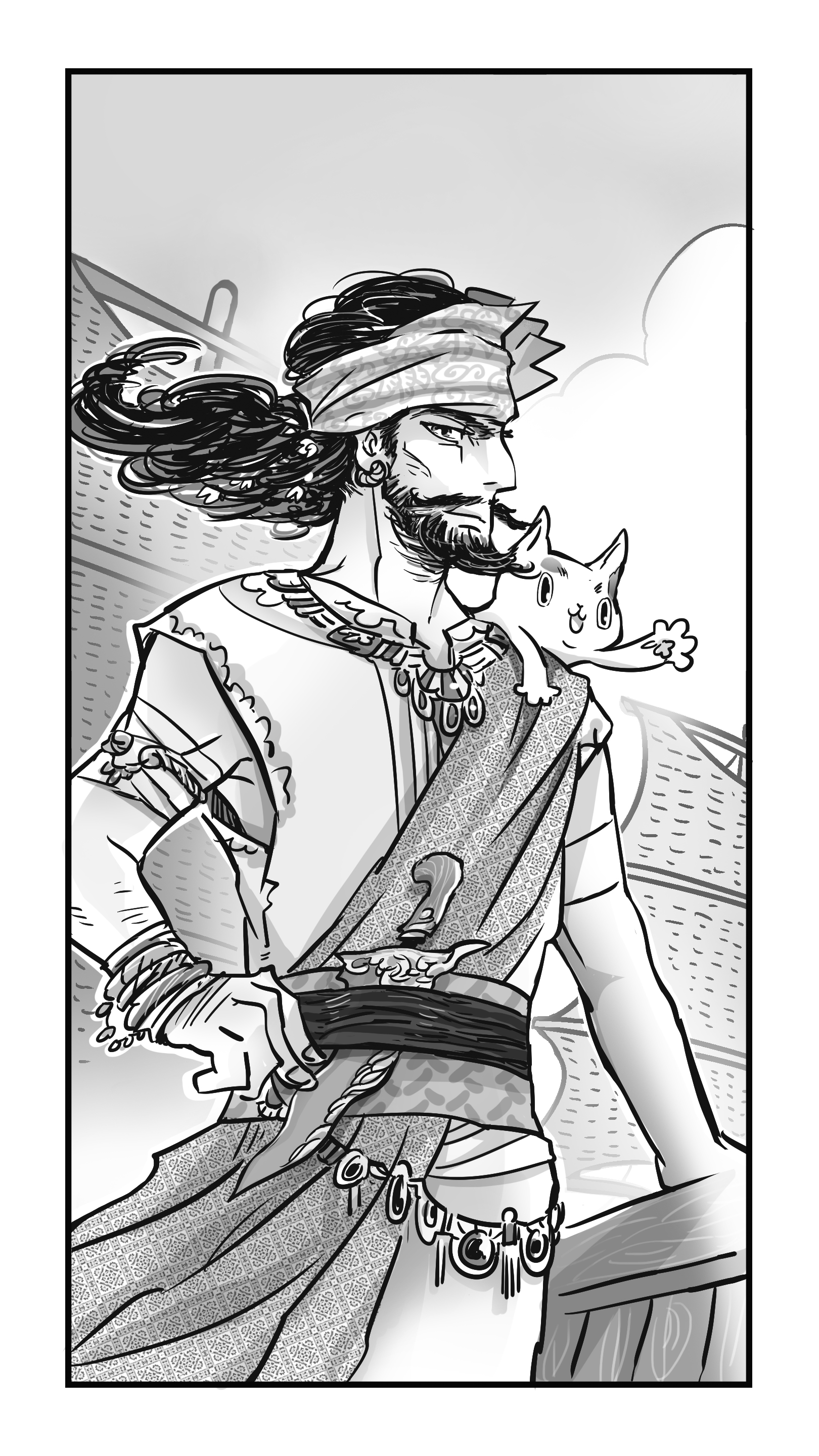
Depiction of Parameswara by Singaporean artist Foo Swee Chin in the educational graphic novel Parameswara and Temasek: The Sacking of Singapore distributed by the Singapore Bicentennial Office.

Within decades after its foundation, Malacca grew into an international trading port and heralded the golden age of Alam Melayu. 80 languages were reportedly spoken in Malacca. Malacca became an important port in the far east during the 16th century. It became so rich that the Portuguese writer and trader Tome Pires said "Whoever is lord of Malacca shall have his hands on the throat of Venice." The new Malay sultanate emerged as the primary base in continuing the historic struggles of its predecessors, Singapura and Srivijaya, against their Java-based nemeses. By the mid-15th century, Majapahit found itself unable to control the rising power of Malacca that began to gain effective control of Malacca straits and expand its influence to Sumatra. The Malay Annals records that, at the height of its power, following the accession to the throne of Sultan Mansur Shah in 1459, Malacca's territory covered much of the Malay peninsula as well as the Riau-Lingga islands and parts of the east coast of Sumatra namely Indragiri, Kampar, Siak, Rokan, Haru and Siantan. Malacca was still looking to expand its territory as late as 1506 when it conquered Kelantan.

The prosperity of Malacca as an international port changed the entire Maritime Southeast Asia and its success was admired by kings from neighbouring kingdoms. As a major entrepôt, Malacca attracted Muslim traders from various part of the world and became a centre of Islam, disseminating the religion throughout Maritime Southeast Asia. The process of Islamisation in the region surrounding Malacca gradually intensified between the 15th and 16th centuries through study centres in Upeh, the district on the north bank of the Malacca River. Islam spread from Malacca to Jambi, Kampar, Bengkalis, Siak, Aru and the Karimun Islands in Sumatra, throughout much of the Malay peninsula, Java and even the Philippines. The Malay Annals reveals that the courts of Malacca and Pasai posed theological questions and problems to one another. Of the so-called Wali Sanga ('nine saints') responsible in spreading Islam on Java, at least two, Sunan Bonang and Sunan Kalijaga, are said to have studied in Malacca. The expansion of Islam into the interiors of Java in the 15th century led to the gradual decline of Malacca's long standing foe, Hindu-Majapahit, before it finally succumbed to the emerging local Muslim forces in the early 16th century. Ultimately, the period spanning from the Malaccan era right until the age of effective European colonisation saw the domination of Malay-Muslim sultanates in trade and politics that eventually contributed to the re-strengthening of Malay domination and cultural influence of the region.

== See also ==
- Strait of Malacca
- Hang Tuah
- Orang Laut

Parameswara of Malacca House of Sang Sapurba Born: 1344 Died: c. 1414
Regnal titles
Preceded by Sri Maharaja	Raja of Singapura; 1389–1398	Succeeded by Kingdom disestablished
Preceded by Position established	Sultan of Malacca; 1402–1414	Succeeded by Megat Iskandar Shah
