= Tun Fatimah =

Malaysian heroine

Tun Fatimah was a well-known heroine and daughter of Tun Mutahir the Malaccan bendahara (vizier) who lived during the 16th century. She was married to Malacca's Sultan Mahmud Shah.

== Early life ==
Through her father's lineage, she is a descendant of both Tun Kudu and Tun Ali's marriage. According to Sejarah Melayu (lit. "Genealogy of Kings"), both were prominent figures in the times of Sultan Muzzafar, the fifth Sultan of Malacca. Tun Kudu was initially married to Muzaffar, who divorced her so that she could marry Tun Ali. Only then would Tun Ali step down from his position as prime minister for the more effective Tun Perak, Tun Kudu's brother, to take his place.

== First marriage to Tun Ali ==
Tun Fatimah was already married to her cousin, Tun Ali (not to be confused with their ancestor of the same name) when Sultan Mahmud set his sights on her to become his new wife. It is said that the Sultan was upset that Tun Mutahir kept the fact that he had a beautiful daughter away from the sultan and married her off to someone else. To add to the problem, many of the Sultan's courtiers felt alienated with Tun Mutahir who elected members of his clan to important posts in the Malaccan government. One of these courtiers was Shahbandar Raja Mudaliar, the Chief of Port of Malacca who allegedly started a rumour that Tun Mutahir was scheming to take over the throne. Tun Fatimah refused to divorce her husband when the Sultan's courtiers urged her to. This proved to be her ultimate undoing because it led to the execution of all of her male relatives in her family, including Tun Mutahir and also her first husband, Tun Ali.

== Second marriage to Sultan Mahmud ==
Tun Fatimah finally complied with the Sultan's wishes. She became his fifth wife. During her time as the royal consort, Tun Fatimah was said to have never smiled, and miscarried three times, perhaps due to emotional misery or even as a silent way of exacting revenge for the injustices committed by the Sultan against her family. She only started bearing children when the Sultan guaranteed her son will succeed him as ruler of Malacca. Fatimah eventually bore the Sultan two Princes and two Princesses. Mahmud had his eldest son, Ahmad Shah, with his first wife Tun Teja, who succeeded him while Fatimah's son was still a minor.

== Role as Queen of Malacca ==
As queen consort, Tun Fatimah made sure those who slandered her father and family were executed. She then went on to become the first Malay woman to lead her people like a charismatic sovereign queen. It is said that the Portuguese were more afraid of the Queen than her reigning Sultan husband. In the early 16th century, the Malays had later lost the war to the Portuguese army. According to Malaysian historians it was a sly foreign Datuk of Malacca who gave out the secrets to them to conquer the city, and thus had eventually made the Malays lost their control of it. Perhaps the fall of Malacca is also partly due to the Sultan's cruelty and disunity among Malaccans at that times.

== Post fall of Malacca ==
Ahmad Shah was deemed incompetent and was killed by Mahmud Shah himself in 1513 after a failed attempt to retake Malacca from the Portuguese. Mahmud Shah then reclaimed the throne, although by then the Malacca sultanate had been abolished, thus making him a pretender. Fatimah's eldest son, Raja Ali went on to become the second ruler of the Johor Sultanate as Sultan Alauddin Riayat Shah for 36 years. After Malacca fell to Portugal in 1511, it seemed that it was mainly Tun Fatimah's work that expanded the new Malay Johor-Riau from Johore and the Riau islands to parts of Sumatra and Borneo. The Malaccan Sultan's power was almost restricted to a figurehead. Tun Fatimah created an alliance with neighbouring kingdoms by letting her children marry the royal families of Aceh, Minangkabau and Borneo. No one knows how long she had lived for, as well as when and where she died. However, fellow historians of the Malay Archipelago suggested that her tombstone is located in Kampar, Riau on the Indonesian island of Sumatra.

== Places and things named after Tun Fatimah ==
- Sekolah Tun Fatimah, a secondary school in Johor Bahru, Johor
- Kolej Tun Fatimah, a residential college at Universiti Teknologi Malaysia in Skudai, Johor
- Tun Fatimah Stadium in Malacca
- Jalan Tun Fatimah in Batu Berendam, Malacca
- Jalan Tun Fatimah in Johor Bahru, Johor
- Kolej Tun Fatimah, a residential college at Universiti Malaysia Perlis, Bintong, Perlis

== Notes ==
- N.B. the terms "Raja" and "Sultan" are used interchangeably to refer to the Malaccan monarch.
