= Tun Ali =

Ali is a personal name that was borne by several historical figures. The word "Tun" was an ancient honorific title used by nobility or people of royal lineage.

- Tun Ali of Malacca, 15th century Bendahara of the Malacca sultanate of Tamil-Malay ethnicity
- Tun Ali bin Tun Tahir, grandson of the above, son to Tun Tahir
