= Tun Perpatih Putih =

6th Bendahara of the Sultanate of Malacca

6th Bendahara of the Sultanate of Malacca
- In office 1498–1500
- Preceded by: Paduka Raja Tun Perak
- Succeeded by: Bendahara Sri Maharaja Tun Mutahir

Tun Perpatih Putih (died 1500) was the 6th bendahara of the Sultanate of Malacca. He succeeded his brother, Tun Perak, in 1498. He has been described as an ineffective bendahara or prime minister, claimed to be due to his old age. Under his administration, political corruption was high in Malacca and struggles between the Gujarat Muslim and Malay people intensified. He was succeeded by the temenggung Bendahara Sri Maharaja Tun Mutahir in 1500 on his death.

Tun Perpatih Putih Bangsawan of Malacca
Regnal titles
Preceded by Tun Perak	Bendahara of Malacca; 1498-1500	Succeeded by Tun Mutahir
