= Megat Iskandar Shah of Malacca =

Sultan of Malacca (r. 1414–1424)

Megat Iskandar Shah سلطان مڬة‌ اسكندر شاه ابن المرحوم راج ڤارميسوار
- 2nd Sultan of Malacca
- Reign: Malacca Sultanate: 1414–1424
- Predecessor: Parameswara
- Successor: Muhammad Shah
- Died: 1424
- Issue: Muhammad Shah
- Father: Parameswara
- Religion: Sunni Islam

Sultan Megat Iskandar Shah ibni Almarhum Raja Parameswara (died 1424) is believed to be either the first or the second Sultan of Malacca and the son of Parameswara. The position of Megat Iskandar Shah as the second ruler of Malacca has historically been contested. Some argued that he is the same person as Parameswara, but was mistaken as a different person after Parameswara converted to Islam and changed his name, others however disagree that such a mistake could be made, and that Megat Iskandar Shah was indeed the second ruler of Malacca.

He maintained a good relationship with the Ming Empire of China and paid tribute to China regularly. According to Portuguese sources he pushed for trade to move to Malacca instead of Singapura.

== Identity ==
Due to discrepancies between Malay, Chinese and Portuguese sources on the early history of Malacca, there have been some differences in opinions about the early rulers of the kingdom. The Malay Annals indicates that the founder of Malacca was Iskandar Shah, while Portuguese sources give the name Parameswara, and that Iskandar Shah was his son. Chinese sources recorded the name Mekat Iskandar Shah as the son of Parameswara. The Raffles MS no.18 version of the Malay Annals refers to the son of Iskandar Shah as Raja Besar Muda, or Raja Kechil Besar / Sultan Megat. Sir Richard Winstedt initially supported the existence of Megat Iskandar Shah as a separate person in 1935. However, soon after the Second World War, he re-evaluated his opinion after the accounts in the Suma Oriental by the Portuguese writer Tomé Pires was published in 1944. Winstedt argued that Ming dynasty sources had mistaken Parameswara and Megat Iskandar Shah as two different persons when Parameswara had merely adopted a new name after converting to Islam in 1414.

George Coedes states that Iskandar Shah was simply the name of Paramesvara after he had converted to Islam and married a daughter of the king of Pasai.

In the 2005 book Admiral Zheng He & Southeast Asia published by Singapore's Institute of Southeast Asian Studies, Professor Wang Gungwu, in his paper The First Three Rulers of Melaka, published in 1968, put forward evidence to support the belief that Megat Iskandar Shah was the second ruler of Malacca. The Ming annals named Parameswara as Bai-li-mi-su-la (拜里迷蘇剌) and his son Mu-gan Sa-yu-ti-er-sha (母幹撒于的兒沙) or Megat Iskandar Shah. Wang argued that the Parameswara had already visited China in 1411 and met the Emperor, and it is therefore unlikely that they would have mistaken him for his son who visited three years later.

According to History of Ming, "The Prince Mugansakandi'ersha (Megat Iskandar Shah) paid tribute to the Yongle Emperor in 1414. After being informed that his father had died, the Emperor gave him gold coins and granted him his inherited title. After that Iskandar Shah paid frequent tribute to the Emperor."

== Conversion ==
According to Suma Oriental written by Tomé Pires, the son of Paramicura (Parameswara), Chaquem Daraxa (Iskandar Shah), converted to Islam at the age of 72 and died when he was 80.

Megat Iskandar Shah of Malacca House of Malacca Died: 1424
Regnal titles
Preceded by Parameswara	Sultan of Malacca; 1414–1424	Succeeded by Muhammad Shah
