= Mustaffa Abd Rahman =

Malaysian businessman

Mustaffa Bin Abd Rahman is a Malaysian businessman and he was conferred the award of "Darjah Kebesaran Peringkat Pertama Sri Sultan Ahmad Shah Pahang" which carries the title Dato' Sri by the Sultan of Pahang on 4 February 2017.

Currently, Dato’ Sri Mustaffa is a Chief Executive Officer and Chairman of AMP Corporation (M) Sdn. Bhd.

== Biography ==
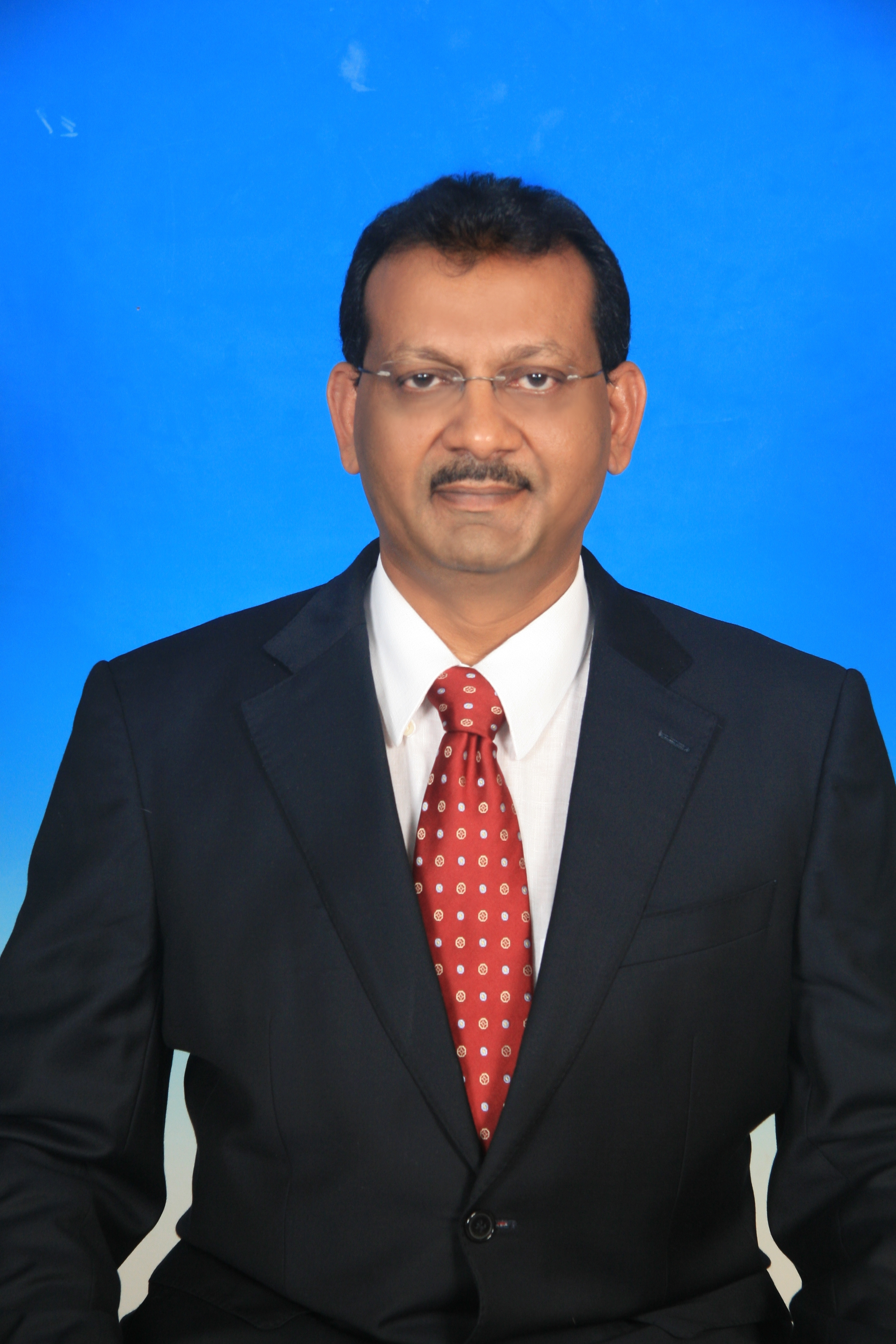
Dato' Sri Mustaffa bin Abd Rahman

Born on 22 September 1960 in Mentakab, the State of Pahang, Dato’ Sri Mustaffa did his early and secondary education at Abu Bakar Primary and Secondary School in his hometown. In 1978, he gained admission into Federal Institute of Technology, graduated in 1980 in Diploma of Electrical & Electronic Engineering and was awarded as a Best Student Leader School of Electrical & Electronic Engineering. In 1991, he attended the Pacific States University, U.S.A. for his degree in Bachelor of Business Administration. Following that in 1996 Dato’ Sri Mustaffa undertook Masters in Marketing from University of Northumbria, UK . Dato’ Sri Mustaffa has 3 sons and 2 daughters

== Career ==
Upon graduation in 1980, Dato’ Sri Mustaffa joined the Computer System Advisers (M) Sdn Bhd as Field Engineer and was based in Kuala Terengganu for 12 years. He then was promoted in 1992 as the Engineering Manager of Komputer Sistem Malaysia, an associate company of Computer Systems Advisors. In 1995, he joined SCM Integrated Systems, based in Vancouver Canada for two years to undertake the design and implementation of Malaysia Sea Surveillance System. He was promoted as a General Manager in 1995 and left the company in 1997.

AMP Corporation Dato’ Sri Mustaffa founded AMP Corporation (M) Sdn Bhd (AMCOP), in 1997. He has also embarked into Agriculture business recently by forming a registered company under AMCOP Agro which owns approximately 40 acres of farmland in Sepang, Selangor. In 2014, AMCOP provided radar surveillance systems to the Malaysian Maritime Enforcement Agency (MMEA) to help combat piracy and illegal shipping in the straits of Malacca.

== Other activities ==
Dato’ Sri Mustaffa was involved in teaching Tae Kwon Do in Terengganu from 1985 until 1989 and holds 2nd Dan Black Belt Degree. He was also active in UMNO as Chief Information Officer UMNO Tun Perak Branch, Bukit Bintang Division from 2003 until 2007. He served as the Chairman of Koperasi Malabar Semenanjung Malaysia from 2012 to 2014. Dato’ Sri Mustaffa is one of the Founder of Gabungan Persatuan Malabari Malaysia which comprises 8 state associations affiliated to the Gabungan. Currently, he is the President of Gabungan Persatuan Malabari Malaysia, Advisor for Surau Malabar Hidayatul Islam Selayang, Advisor of Persatuan Keturunan Malabari Pahang and Advisor of Persatuan Keluarga Osali Bibi Perak.

== Business awards ==
- SMI Association of Malaysia SERVICE EXCELLENCE for year 2012, 2013 and 2014
- SIN CHEW BUSINESS EXCELLENCE Awards for year 2013, 2014 and 2016
- ASIA PACIFIC International Entrepreneur Award for year 2012
- ATC GLOBAL INTERNATIONAL Air Traffic Management Global Award Finalist Only Company Selected From Malaysia Year 2013 Amsterdam. SME100 Awards Fast Moving Companies Year 2014
- ANUGERAH MAJIKAN MALAYSIA by Human Resources Department presented by YAB Dato’ Seri Mohd Najib
- ASEAN BUSINESS AWARDS MALAYSIA 2015 ABAM Presented by YAB Dato’ Sri Mohd Najib Prime Minister Malaysia
- Brand Laureate Best Brand Award on Corporate Branding 2014
- TOP 10 Most Admired Company Award
- ANUGERAH PERSONALITI INDUSTRI DAN USAHAWAN MALAYSIA 2017 Usahawan Sistem Teknikal dan Pengawasan by Niaga Times.

Year	Awards Conferred	State
1989	Pingat Jasa Kebatian (PJK)	Terengganu
2006	Darjah Indera Mahkota Pahang (DIMP)	Pahang
2011	Darjah Setia Bakti Negeri Sembilan (DATO)	Negeri Sembilan

== Media publications ==
He has also appeared in numerous publications and media on his achievements as the following details:

- The MANAGEMENT MAGAZINE – Cover Page & Vol 48 No. 2 (2013)
- MAJALAH DEWAN EKONOMI – Cover Page JANUARY 2013
- MALAYSIA SME PILLARS – 11 MARCH 2015 (SME CORP)
- Small Medium Enterprise BUMIPUTERA CEO (SME CORP) - 2015
- TOP 10 MAGAZINE COVER PAGE – AUGUST 2013
- STAR BIZZ SECTION - 5 MARCH 2014
- MAJALAH MINGGUAN WANITA – FEB 2014 Page 122/123
- ASTRO Channel, RTM and TV3 Channels
