= Tun Ali of Malacca =

4th bendahara of the Malacca Sultanate

Tun Ali

4th Bendahara of the Malacca Sultanate
- In office 1445–1456
- Preceded by: Sri Wak Raja Tun Perpatih Sedang
- Succeeded by: Paduka Raja Tun Perak

Bendahara Sri Nara Diraja Tun Ali was a Tamil Muslim and the fourth bendahara of the Malacca Sultanate. He was the penghulu bendahari of Malacca before becoming bendahara. He allegedly conspired to assassinate the sultan of Malacca, Raja Sri Parameswara Dewa Shah. According to other sources, Tun Ali and his nephew, Raja Kassim was conspiring to murder Raja Rokan who was disliked by palace officials. It was said that during the attack, Raja Rokan who was with Sri Parameswara stabbed the king in retaliation to an attacker stabbing Raja Rokan. Tun Ali and Raja Kassim was unable to save the king. Tun Ali then installed Raja Kassim as the monarch of Malacca who took the title Sultan Muzaffar Shah. Tun Ali stepped down in 1446 upon the advice of Sultan Muzaffar in favour of Bendahara Paduka Raja Tun Perak.

== Grandson ==
Tun Ali's grandson by Tun Tahir (who shared the same name with him) married Tun Fatimah, the daughter of his second son Bendahara Seri Maharaja Tun Mutahir. Tun Ali was then executed on the order of Sultan Mahmud Shah along with Tun Mutahir after Tun Mutahir was accused of treason by Raja Mudaliar. Sultan Mahmud then married Tun Fatimah.

Tun Ali of Malacca Bangsawan of Malacca
Regnal titles
| Preceded by Tun Perpatih Sedang | Bendahara of Malacca; 1445–1456 | Succeeded by Tun Perak |
