= Malacca Sultanate =

State on the Malay Peninsula, 1400–1511

Coordinates: 2°12′N 102°15′E

Sultanate of Malacca کسلطانن ملاک Kesultanan Melaka
- c. 1400–1511/1528
- The extent of the Sultanate in the 15th century, during the reign of Mansur Shah. Pre-modern Southeast Asian political borders are subject to speculation.
- Capital: Malacca (1400–1511); Bintan (1511–1526); Kampar (1526–1528)
- Common languages: Classical Malay
- Religion: Sunni Islam
- Demonym: Malaccan
- Government: Absolute monarchy
- Raja/Sultan
  - 1400–1414: Parameswara (Iskandar Shah (disputed name))
  - 1414–1424: Megat Iskandar Shah
  - 1424–1444: Muhammad Shah
  - 1444–1446: Abu Syahid Shah
  - 1446–1459: Muzaffar Shah
  - 1459–1477: Mansur Shah
  - 1477–1488: Alauddin Riayat Shah
  - 1488–1511: Mahmud Shah
  - 1511–1513: Ahmad Shah
  - 1513–1528: Mahmud Shah
- Bendahara
  - 1400–1412: Tun Perpatih Besar (first)
  - 1445–1456: Tun Ali
  - 1456–1498: Tun Perak
  - 1498–1500: Tun Perpatih Putih
  - 1500–1510: Tun Mutahir
  - 1510–1511: Tun Hamzah

Establishment
  - Founding: c. 1400
  - Capture of Malacca: 1511
  - Partition into Johor Sultanate and Perak Sultanate: 1528
- Currency: Tin ingot, native gold and silver coins
Preceded by
| Kingdom of Singapura |
Succeeded by
| Johor Sultanate |
| Perak Sultanate |
| Pahang Sultanate |
| Portuguese Malacca |
- Today part of: Malaysia; Indonesia; Singapore; Thailand

The Malacca Sultanate (Malay: Kesultanan Melaka; Jawi script: کسلطانن ملاک) was a Malay sultanate based in the modern-day state of Malacca, Malaysia. Conventional historical thesis marks c. 1400 as the founding year of the sultanate by King of Singapura, Parameswara, also known as Iskandar Shah, although earlier dates for its founding have been proposed. At the height of the sultanate's power in the 15th century, its capital grew into one of the most important transshipment ports of its time, with territory covering much of the Malay Peninsula, the Riau Islands and part of the central eastern coast of Sumatra in present-day Indonesia.

As a bustling international trading port, Malacca emerged as a centre for Islamic learning and dissemination, and encouraged the development of the Malay language, literature and arts. It heralded the golden age of Malay sultanates in the archipelago, in which Classical Malay became the lingua franca of Maritime Southeast Asia and Jawi script became the primary medium for cultural, religious and intellectual exchange. It is through these intellectual, spiritual and cultural developments, that the Malaccan era witnessed the establishment of a Malay identity, the Malayisation of the region and the subsequent formation of the Malay world.

In 1511, the capital of Malacca fell to the Portuguese Empire, forcing the last Sultan, Mahmud Shah (r. 1488–1511), to retreat south, where his progenies established new ruling dynasties, Johor and Perak. The political and cultural legacy of the sultanate has endured for centuries, where Malacca has been held up as an example of Malay-Muslim civilisation to this day. It established systems of trade, diplomacy, and governance that persisted well into the 19th century, and introduced concepts such as daulat—a distinctly Malay notion of sovereignty—that continues to shape contemporary understanding of Malay kingship.

== History ==
=== Early foundation ===
The founding of Malacca is generally taken to be c. 1400. The region was dominated by the Srivijaya empire centered on Palembang in Sumatra until it was weakened by the Chola Empire in the 11th century. By the end of the 13th century, the Javanese Singhasari followed by the Majapahit had become dominant.

According to the Malay Annals, a prince from Palembang named Seri Teri Buana who claimed to be a descendant of Alexander the Great stayed on Bintan Island for several years before he set sail and landed on Temasek in 1299. The Orang Laut, known for their loyal services to Srivijaya, eventually made him king of a new kingdom called Singapura. In the 14th century, Singapura developed concurrently with the Pax Mongolica era and rose from a small trading outpost into a centre of international trade with strong ties to the Yuan dynasty.

In an effort to revive the fortune of Malayu in Sumatra, in the 1370s, a Malay ruler of Palembang sent an envoy to the court of the first emperor of the newly established Ming dynasty. He invited China to resume the tributary system, just like Srivijaya did centuries earlier. Learning of this diplomatic maneuver, King Hayam Wuruk of Majapahit sent an envoy to Nanking and convinced the emperor that Malayu was their vassal, and not an independent country. Subsequently, in 1377—a few years after the death of Gajah Mada, Majapahit sent a punitive naval attack against a rebellion in Palembang, which caused the diaspora of the Palembang princes and nobles.

By the second half of the 14th century, the Kingdom of Singapura grew wealthy. However, its success alarmed two regional powers at that time, Ayutthaya to the north and Majapahit to the south. As a result, the kingdom's fortified capital was attacked by at least two major foreign invasions before it was finally sacked by either Ayutthaya or Majapahit in 1398. The last king of Singapura then fled to the west coast of the Malay Peninsula.

Malay and Portuguese sources give different accounts of the fall of Singapura and its last king. In Portuguese sources, he is referred to as Parameswara and originated in Palembang but usurped the throne of Singapura, but in Malay sources he is Iskandar Shah, a descendant of Seri Teri Buana who became the fifth king of Singapura. Parameswara fled north to Muar, Ujong Tanah and Biawak Busuk before reaching a fishing village at the mouth of Bertam River (modern-day Malacca River). The village belonged to the Orang Laut who were left alone by Majapahit's forces that not only sacked Singapura but also Langkasuka and Pasai. As a result, the village became a safe haven and in the 1370s it began to receive a growing number of refugees fleeing Majapahit's attacks. By the time Parameswara reached Malacca in the early 1400s, the place was already cosmopolitan feel with Buddhists from the north, Hindus from Palembang and Muslims from Pasai.

Legend has it that Parameswara saw a mouse deer outwit his hunting dog into the water when he was resting under the Malacca tree. He thought this bode well, stating, "this place is excellent, even the mouse deer is formidable; it is best that we establish a kingdom here". Tradition holds that he named the settlement after the tree he was leaning against while witnessing the portentous event. Today, the mouse deer is part of modern Malacca's coat of arms. The name "Malacca" itself was derived from the fruit-bearing Melaka tree (Malay: Pokok Melaka) scientifically termed as Phyllanthus emblica. Another theory to the origin of Malacca's name is that it originated from Arab merchants, during the reign of Sultan Muhammad Shah (r. 1424–1444), who called the kingdom "Malakat" (Arabic for "congregation of merchants") because it was home to many trading communities.

=== Growth ===
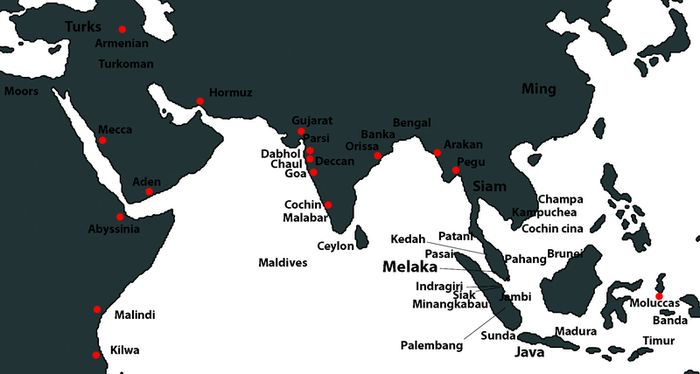
Map of 15th century Malacca and its contemporaries.

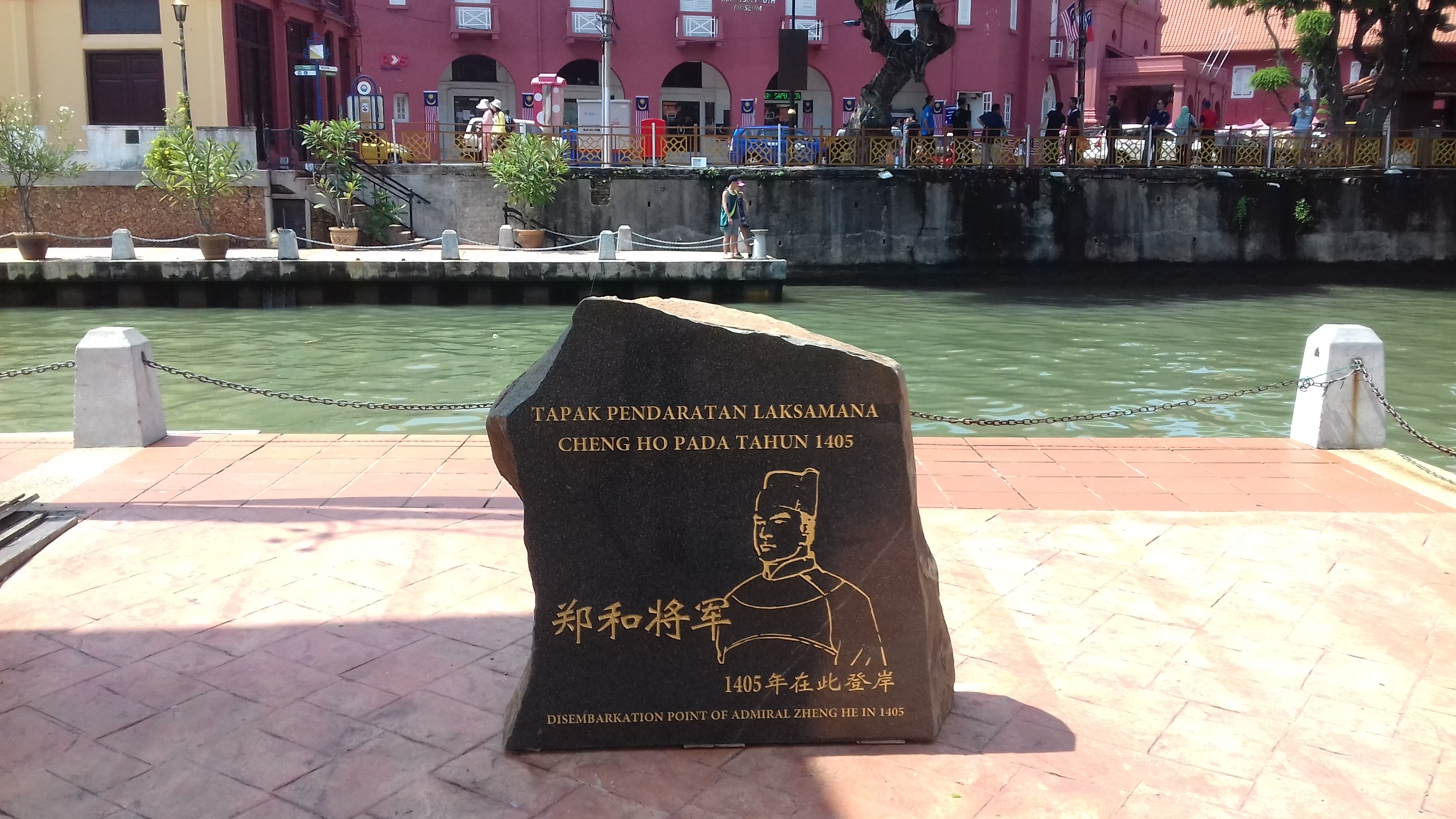
A memorial rock for the disembarkation point of Admiral Zheng He in 1405.

Following the establishment of his new city in Malacca, Parameswara began to develop the city and laid the foundation of a trade port. The Orang Laut, were employed to patrol the adjacent sea areas, to repel pirates, and to direct traders to Malacca. Within years, news about Malacca becoming a centre of trade and commerce began to spread across the eastern part of the world. In 1405, the Yongle Emperor of the Ming dynasty (r. 1402–1424) sent his envoy headed by Yin Qing to Malacca. Yin Qing's visit paved the way for the establishment of friendly relations between Malacca and China. Two years later, Admiral Zheng He made his first of six visits to Malacca. Zheng He called at Malacca and brought Parameswara with him on his return to China, a recognition of his position as ruler of Malacca. In exchange for regular tribute, the Chinese emperor offered Malacca protection from the constant threat of Siamese attack. Due to Chinese involvement, Malacca had grown as a key alternative to other important and established ports. Chinese merchants began calling at the port and pioneering foreign trading bases in Malacca. Other foreign traders, notably the Arabs, Indians, and Persians came to establish their trading bases and settle in Malacca, raising its population to 2,000. In 1411, Parameswara headed a royal party of 540 people and left for China with Admiral Zheng He to visit the Ming court. In 1414, the Ming Shilu mentions that the son of the first ruler of Malacca visited the Ming court to inform Yongle that his father had died.

There is uncertainty in the chronology of the early rulers of Malacca due to discrepancies contained in Malay, Chinese and Portuguese sources, such as the names, number of rulers and reign details:

Early rulers of Malacca Sultanate according to different sources
| Malay Annals Raffles MS (Note: Another version of the Malay Annals gave 6 rulers instead of the 5 here, giving Raja Tengah and Sultan Mohammed Shah as two separate persons) | Bustan al-Salatin 1638 | Suma Oriental 1512–1515 | Ming Shilu 1425–1455 |
|---|---|---|---|
| Raja Iskandar Shah | Sri Rama Adikerma (Raja Iskandar Shah) | Parameswara (Paramicura) | Parameswara (拜里迷蘇剌) |
| Raja Kechil Besar (Sultan Megat) | Raja Besar Muda (Sultan Ahmad) | Iskandar Shah (Chaquem Daraxa) | Megat Iskandar Shah (母幹撒于的兒沙) |
| Raja Tengah (Sultan Mohammed Shah) | Raja Tengah | | Sri Maharaja (西里馬哈剌者) |
| Raja Ibrahim (Sultan Abu-Shahid) | Raja Kechil Besar (Sultan Mohammad Shah) | | Sri Parameswara Dewa Shah (息力八密息瓦兒丢八沙) |
| Raja Kassim (Sultan Muzaffar Shah) | Raja Kasim (Sultan Muzaffar Shah) | Sultan Muzaffar Shah (Sultan Modafaixa) | Sultan Muzaffar Shah (速魯檀無答佛哪沙) |

Due to the differences, there are disagreements about the early rulers of Malacca. It is, however, generally accepted that the Parameswara of Portuguese and Chinese sources and Iskandar Shah of the Malay Annals were the same person, but a number of authors also accept the similarly named Megat Iskandar Shah as Parameswara's son. During the reign of Megat Iskandar Shah (r. 1414–1424), the kingdom continued to prosper, the Sultan's control spread from Kuala Linggi to Kuala Kesang, roughly corresponding to the modern state of Malacca. The period saw the diversification of economic sources of the kingdom with the discovery of two tin mining areas in the northern part of the city, sago palms in the orchards and nipah palms lining in the estuaries and beaches. To improve the defence mechanism of the city from potential aggressors, Megat Iskandar Shah ordered the construction of a wall surrounding the city with four guarded entrances. A fenced fortress was also built in the town centre where the state's treasury and supply were stored. The growth of Malacca coincided with the rising power of Ayutthaya to the north. The growing ambitions of Ayutthaya against its neighbours and the Malay Peninsula had alarmed the ruler of Malacca. In a preemptive measure, the king headed a royal visit to China in 1418 to raise his concerns about the threat. Yongle responded in October 1419 by sending his envoy to warn the Siamese ruler. Relationship between China and Malacca were further strengthened by several envoys to China, led by the Malaccan princes, in 1420, 1421 and 1423.

Modern depictions of Malacca Sultanate

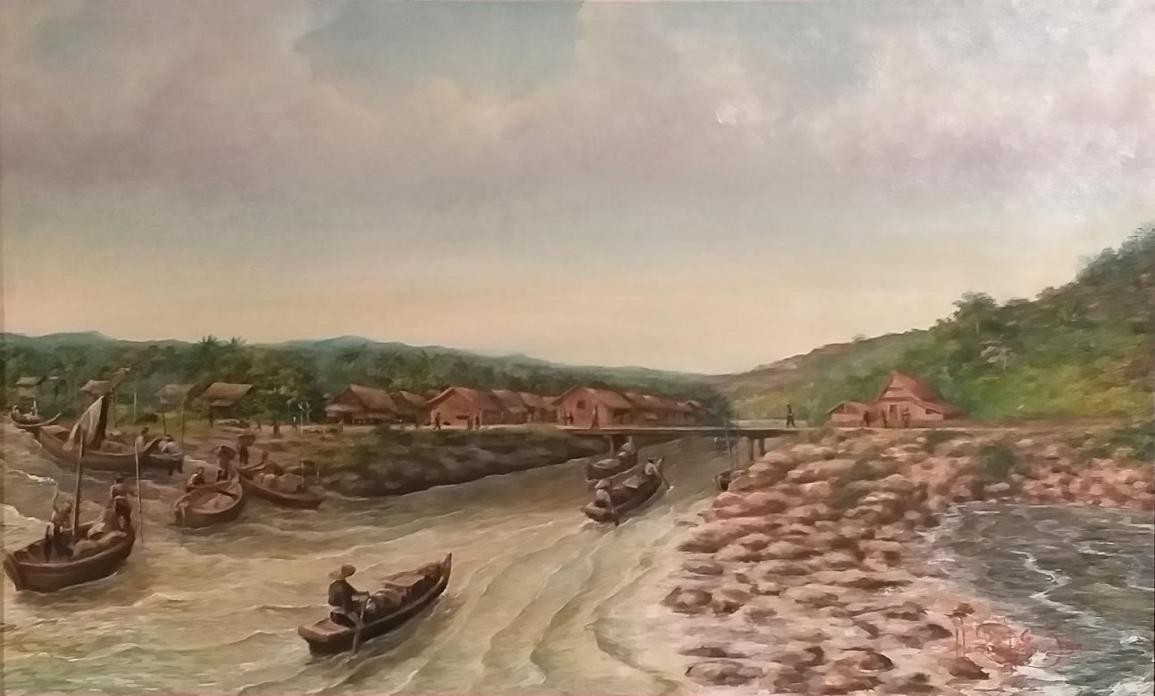
Reconstruction of the port of Malacca after its foundation, from Malacca Maritime Museum

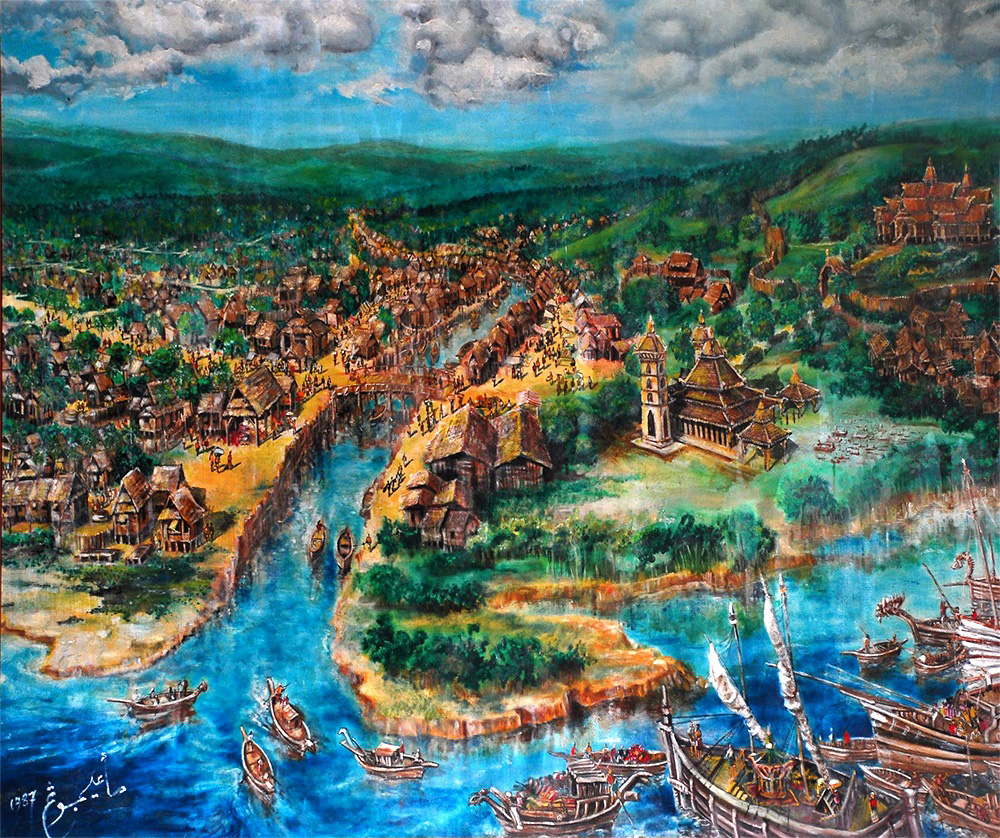
Malacca Sultanate during the reign of Sultan Alauddin Riayat Shah (1477–1488) by Maembong Ayoh

Between 1424 and 1433, two more royal visits to China were made during the reign of the third ruler, Raja Tengah (r. 1424–1444), named Sri Maharaja in some sources. During Raja Tengah's rule, it was said that an ulama called Saiyid Abdul Aziz came to Malacca to spread the teaching of Islam. The king together with his royal family, senior officials and the subjects of Malacca listened to his teachings. Shortly after, Raja Tengah adopted the Muslim name, Muhammad Shah and the title Sultan on the advice of the ulama. He began to Islamise his administration—customs, royal protocols, bureaucracy and commerce were made to conform to the principles of Islam. As Malacca became increasingly important as an international trading centre, the equitable regulation of trade was the key to continued prosperity—and the Undang-Undang Laut Melaka (Maritime Laws of Malacca), promulgated during the reign of Sultan Muhammad Shah, was an important facet of this. So too was the appointment of four Shahbandars for the different communities of the port. This accommodated foreign traders, who were also assigned their own enclaves in the city. In the 1430s, China had reversed its policy of maritime expansion. However, by then Malacca was strong enough militarily to defend itself. In spite of these developments, China maintained a continuous show of friendship, suggesting that it placed Malacca in high regard. In fact, although it was China's practice to consider most foreign countries as vassal states – including Italy and Portugal – its relations with Malacca were characterised by mutual respect and friendship, such as that between two sovereign countries.

Muhammad Shah died in 1444 after reigning for twenty years and left behind two sons; Raja Kasim, the son of Tun Wati who in turn a daughter of a wealthy Indian merchant, and Raja Ibrahim, the son of the Princess of Rokan. He was succeeded by his younger son, Raja Ibrahim, who reigned as Sultan Abu Syahid Shah (r. 1444–1446). Abu Syahid was a weak ruler and his administration was largely controlled by Raja Rokan, a cousin of his mother who stayed in the court of Malacca during his reign. The situation prompted court officials to plan the assassination of Raja Rokan and to install Raja Kasim on the throne. Both the Sultan and Raja Rokan were eventually killed in the attack in 1446. Raja Kasim was then appointed as the fifth ruler of Malacca and reign as Sultan Muzaffar Shah (r. 1446–1459). The looming threat from the Siamese kingdom of Ayutthaya became a reality when it launched a land invasion of Malacca in 1446. Tun Perak, the chief of Klang brought his men to help Malacca in the battle against the Siamese, in which Malacca emerged victorious. His strong leadership qualities gained the attention of the Sultan, whose desire to see Malacca prosper made him appoint Tun Perak as the Bendahara. In 1456, during the reign of King Trailokanat, Ayutthaya launched another attack, this time by sea. When news about the attack reached Malacca, naval forces were immediately rallied and a defensive line was made near Batu Pahat. The forces were commanded by Tun Perak and assisted by Tun Hamzah, a warrior known as Datuk Bongkok. The two sides clashed in a fierce naval battle in which the more advanced Malaccan navy succeeded in driving off the Siamese, pursuing them to Singapura and forcing them to return home. Malacca's victory in this battle gave it new confidence to devise strategies to extend its influence throughout the region. The defeat of Ayutthaya brought political stability to Malacca and enhanced its reputation in South East Asia.

=== Golden era ===
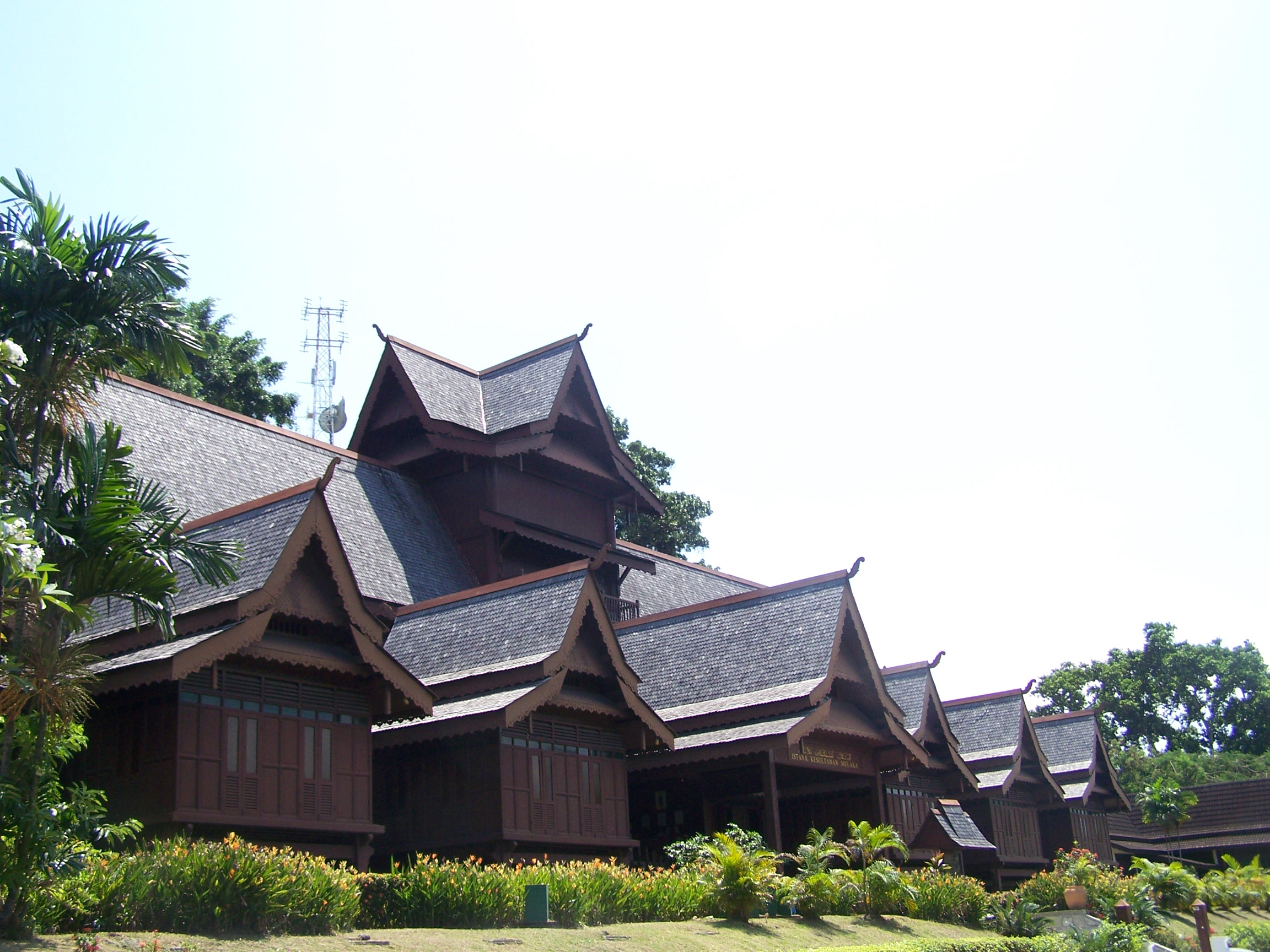
The replica of Malacca Sultanate's palace which was built from information and data obtained from the Malay Annals. This historical document had references to the construction and the architecture of palaces during the era of Sultan Mansur Shah, who ruled from 1458 to 1477.

Malacca reached its height of glory between the mid to late 15th century up to before the Portuguese occupation. The reign of Sultan Muzaffar Shah saw the territorial incorporation of the region between Dindings and Johor, and was the first Malaccan ruler to impose authority over both the western and eastern ends of the Malay Peninsula. The kingdom controlled a section of global trade on a vital choke point; the narrow strait that today bears its name, the Strait of Malacca. Its port city had become the centre of regional and international trade, attracting regional traders as well as traders from major states such as the Chinese Ming dynasty, the Ryukyu Kingdom as well as Persians, Gujarats and Arabs.

The reign of Mansur Shah (r. 1459–1477) witnessed a major expansion of the sultanate. Among the earliest territory ceded to the sultanate was Pahang, with its capital, Inderapura—a massive unexplored land with a large river and abundant source of gold which was ruled by Maharaja Dewa Sura, a relative of the King of Ligor. The Sultan dispatched a fleet of two hundred ships, led by Tun Perak and 19 Malaccan hulubalangs. On reaching Pahang, a battle broke out in which the Pahangites were decisively defeated and its entire royal court were captured. The Malaccan fleet returned home with Dewa Sura and his daughter, Wanang Seri who were handed over to Sultan Mansur Shah. The Sultan appointed Tun Hamzah to rule Pahang. A policy of rapprochement with Ligor was later initiated by Mansur Shah to ensure steady supplies of rice.

On his royal visit to Majapahit, Mansur Shah was also accompanied by these warriors. At that time, Majapahit was already declining and found itself unable to overcome the rising power of the Malaccan Sultanate. After a display of Malaccan military prowess in his court, the king of Majapahit, afraid of losing more territories, agreed to marry off his daughter, Raden Galuh Cendera Kirana to Sultan Mansur Shah and hand over control of Indragiri, Jambi, Tungkal and Siantan to Malacca. Mansur Shah was also able to vassalise Siak in Sumatra. Later in his reign, Pahang, Kampar and Indragiri rebelled but were eventually subdued.

The friendly relations between China and Malacca escalated during the reign of Sultan Mansur Shah. The Sultan sent an envoy headed by Tun Perpatih Putih to China, carrying a diplomatic letter from the Sultan to the Emperor. According to the Malay Annals, Tun Perpatih succeeded in impressing the Emperor of China with the fame and grandeur of Sultan Mansur Shah that the Emperor decreed that his daughter, Hang Li Po, should marry the Sultan. The Malay Annals further asserts that a senior minister of state and five hundred ladies in waiting accompanied the "princess" to Malacca. The Sultan built a palace for his new consort on a hill known ever afterwards as Bukit Cina ("Chinese Hill"). As trade flourished and Malacca became more prosperous, Mansur Shah ordered the construction of a large and beautiful palace at the foot of Malacca Hill. The royal palace reflected the wealth, prosperity and power of Malacca and embodied the excellence and distinct characteristics of Malay architecture.

The brief conflict between Malacca and Đại Việt during the reign of Lê Thánh Tông (r. 1460–1497), began shortly after the 1471 Vietnamese invasion of Champa, then already a Muslim kingdom. The Chinese government, without knowing about the event, sent a censor Ch'en Chun to Champa in 1474 to install the Champa King, but he discovered Vietnamese soldiers had taken over Champa and were blocking his entry. He proceeded to Malacca instead and its ruler sent back tribute to China. In 1469, Malaccan envoys on their return from China was attacked by the Vietnamese who castrated the young and enslaved them. In view of the Lê dynasty's position as a protectorate to China, Malacca abstained from any act of retaliation. Instead, Malacca sent envoys to China in 1481 to report on the Vietnamese aggression and their invasion plan against Malacca, as well as to confront the Vietnamese envoys who happened to be present in the Ming court. However, the Chinese informed that since the incident was years old, they could do nothing about it, and the Chinese Emperor Chenghua sent a letter to the Vietnamese ruler reproaching him for the incident. The Emperor also granted permission for Malacca to retaliate with violent force should the Vietnamese attack, an event that never happened again. According to a Chinese historical account by Mao Qiling in his work Man Si He Zhi, Lê Thánh Tông led 90,000 men on an invasion to Lan Sang but this force was chased away by a Malaccan army that beheaded 30,000 Đại Việt soldiers.

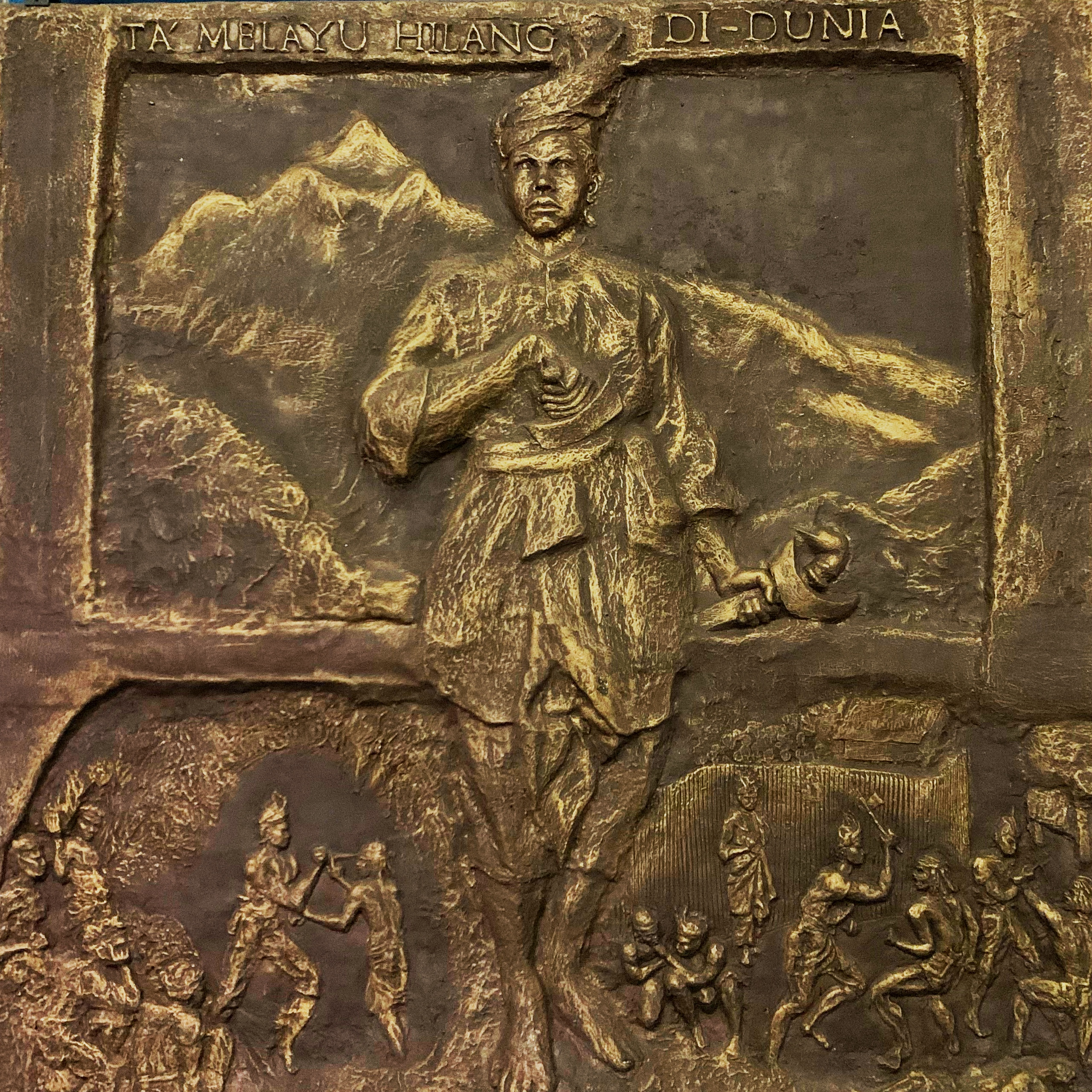
A bronze relief of Hang Tuah, a legendary Malay hero. Exhibited at the National Museum, Kuala Lumpur, Malaysia.

The expansionist policy of Mansur Shah was maintained throughout his reign when he later added Kampar and Siak to his realm. He also turned a number of states in the archipelago into his imperial dependencies. The ruler of such states would come to Malacca after their coronation to obtain the blessing of the Sultan of Malacca. Rulers who had been overthrown also came to Malacca requesting the Sultan's aid in reclaiming their throne. One such examples was Sultan Zainal Abidin of Pasai who was toppled by his relatives. He fled to Malacca and pleaded with Sultan Mansur Shah to reinstall him as a ruler. Malacca armed forces were immediately sent to Pasai and defeated the usurpers. Although Pasai never came under the control of Malacca afterwards, the event greatly demonstrated the importance of Malacca and the mutual support it had established among leaders and states in the region. Sultan Mansur Shah died in 1477 whilst Malacca was at the peak of its splendour.

The prosperous era of Malacca continued under the rule of his son, Sultan Alauddin Riayat Shah (r. 1477–1488) and more foreign rulers within the region began paying homage to the Sultan of Malacca. Among them were a ruler from the Moluccas who were defeated by his enemies, a ruler of Rokan and a ruler named Tuan Telanai from Terengganu. Alauddin Riayat Shah placed a great importance in maintaining peace and order during his reign. He extended the conquests of his father to include the Riau-Lingga islands. He was succeeded by his son, Sultan Mahmud Shah (r. 1488–1511) who was a teenage boy upon his accession. Hence Malacca was administered by Bendahara Tun Perak with the help of other senior officials. The town of Malacca continued to prosper with an influx of foreign traders after the appointment of Tun Mutahir as Bendahara. This was due to his efficient and wise administration and his ability to attract more foreign traders to Malacca. By about 1500, Malacca was at the height of its power and glory, this can be exemplified by Mahmud Shah's rejection of the overlordship of both Ayutthaya and the declining Majapahit, with the former resulting in an abortive invasion. Its city of Malacca was the chief centre of trade in Indian cloth, Chinese porcelain and silk and Malay spices, and the headquarters of Muslim activity in the Malay Archipelago. Malacca was still looking to expand its territory as late as 1506, when it conquered Kelantan. While the legendary Princess of Gunung Ledang was said to have lived during the reign of Mahmud Shah and was once wooed by the sultan himself.

=== Portuguese invasion ===
By the 15th century, Europe had developed an appetite for spices. At that time, the spice trade was virtually monopolised by Venetian merchants via a convoluted trade route through the Arabian Peninsula and India, which in turn linked to its source in the Maluku Islands via Malacca. Upon becoming king in 1481, John II of Portugal decided to break this chain and control the lucrative spice trade directly from its source. This led to the expansion of Portuguese sea exploration, pioneered by Vasco da Gama, into the east coasts of India that resulted in the establishment of Portuguese stronghold in Calicut.

Years later, during the reign of Manuel I, a fidalgo named Diogo Lopes de Sequeira was assigned to analyse trade potential in Madagascar and Malacca. He arrived in Malacca on 1 August 1509 carrying with him a letter from the King. His mission was to establish trade with Malacca. The Tamil Muslims who were now powerful in the Malaccan court and friendly with Tun Mutahir, the Bendahara, were hostile towards the Christian Portuguese. The Gujarati merchants who were also Muslims and had known the Portuguese in India, preached a holy war against "the infidels". Because of the dissension between Mahmud Shah and Tun Mutahir, a plot was hatched to kill de Sequeira, imprison his men and capture the Portuguese fleet anchored off the Malacca River. The plot leaked out and de Sequeira managed to escape from Malacca in his ship, leaving behind several of his men who were taken captive.

In April 1511 Afonso de Albuquerque, who was the Portuguese expedition leader together with his armada, arrived in Malacca to sever its Islamic and Venetian trade. His intention was described in his own words when he arrived to Malacca:

If they were only to take "Malaca" out of the hands of the Moors, Cairo and Mecca would be entirely ruined, and Venice would then be able to obtain no spiceries except what her merchants might buy in Portugal.

— Report on Albuquerque's words on his arrival to Malacca.

The Portuguese launch their first attack on 25 July 1511, but this was met with failure. Albuquerque then launched another attack on 15 August 1511, which proved successful as Malacca was captured on that day. The Portuguese constructed a fortress called A Famosa using rocks and stones taken from Muslim graves, mosques, and other buildings. Several churches and convents, a bishop's palace, and administrative buildings such as the governor's palace were built. The Portuguese imposed higher taxes on Chinese traders and restricted their ownership of land. The news of the city's capture reached the Ming dynasty of China; the Chinese were also displeased about the kidnapping of many Chinese children by the Portuguese in Tuen Mun. In retaliation for Portugal's activity in Malacca, several Portuguese were later killed by the Chinese in the battles of Tunmen and Xicaowan in China.

== Aftermath (post-1511) ==
=== Portuguese Malacca ===
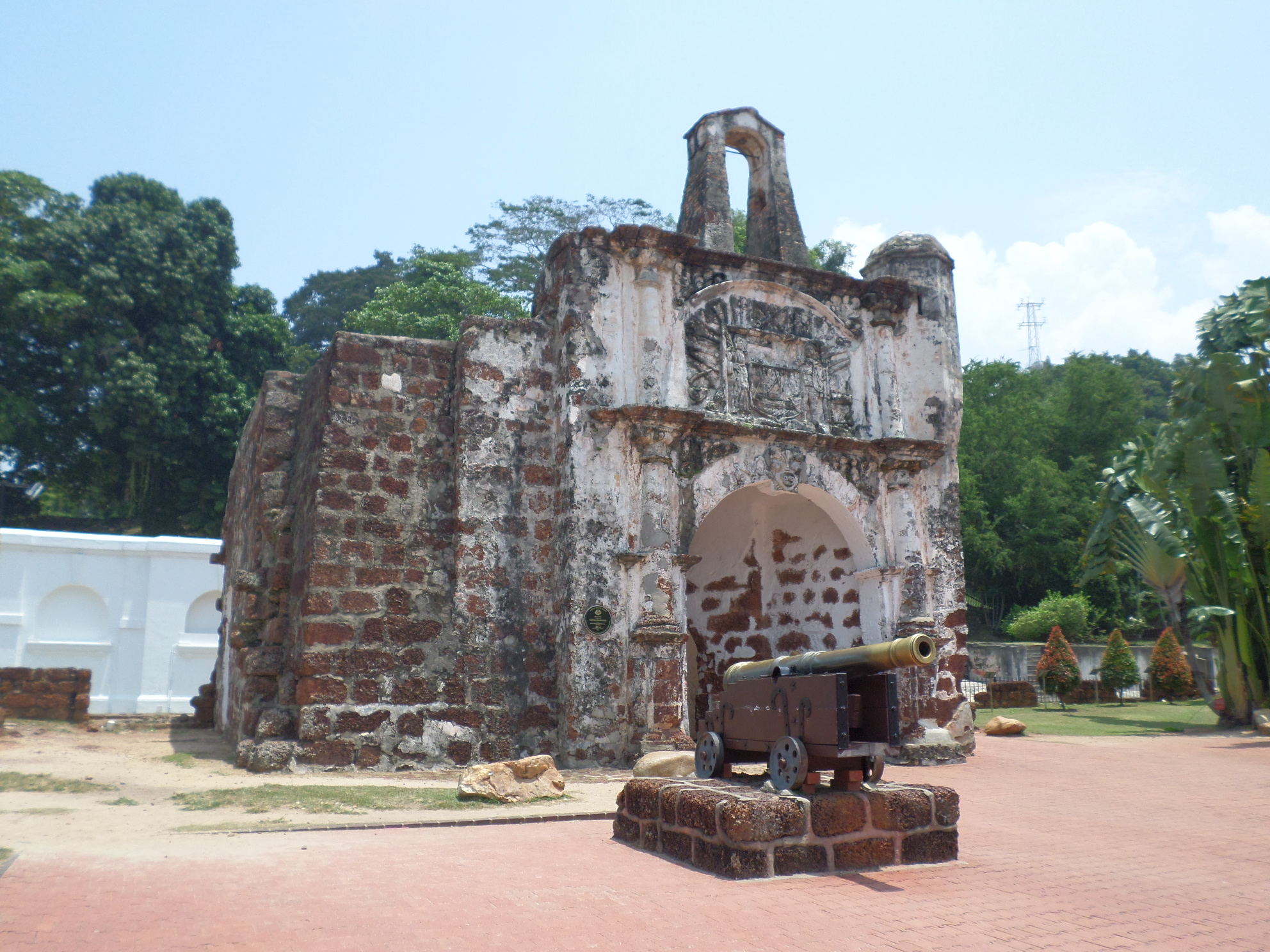
The surviving gate of the Portuguese Fortress of Malacca

Following the 1511 conquest, the city of Malacca remained under Portuguese control for the next 130 years despite incessant attempts by the former rulers of Malacca and other regional powers to dislodge them (see Malay–Portuguese conflicts). Around the foothill on which the Sultan's Istana (palace) once stood, the Portuguese built the stone fort known as A Famosa, completed in 1512. Malay graves, the mosque and other buildings were dismantled to obtain the stone that was used to build the fort. Despite numerous attacks, the fort was only breached once, when the Dutch and Johor defeated the Portuguese in 1641.

It soon became clear that Portuguese control of Malacca did not mean they controlled the Asian trade centred on it. Their rule in Malacca was marred with difficulties. They could not become self-sufficient and remained highly dependent on Asian suppliers, as had their Malay predecessors. They were short of both funds and manpower and the administration was hampered by organizational confusion and command overlap, corruption and inefficiency. Competition from other regional ports such as Johor which was founded by the exiled Sultan of Malacca, saw Asian traders bypass Malacca and the city began to decline as a trading port. Rather than achieving their ambition of dominating it, the Portuguese had fundamentally disrupted the organisation of the Asian trade network. The previously centralised port of exchange that policed the Strait of Malacca to maintain its safety for commercial traffic, was replaced with scattered trading network with multiple ports rivalling each other in the strait.

The efforts to propagate Christianity, which was also one of the principal aims of Portuguese imperialism, did not meet with much success, primarily because Islam was already strongly entrenched among the local population.

=== Chinese retaliation ===
Melaka is a country which offers tribute and which has been Imperially enfeoffed. The Fo-lang-ji have annexed it and, enticing us with gain, are seeking enfeoffment and rewards. Righteousness will certainly not allow this. It is requested that their gift be refused, that the difference between according and disobedience be clearly made known and that they be advised that only after they have returned the territory of Melaka will they be allowed to come to Court to offer a gift. If they refuse and blindly hold to their ways, although the foreign yi are not used to using weapons, we will have to summon the various yi to arms, proclaim the crimes and punish the Fo-lang-ji, so as to make clear the Great Precepts of Right Conduct.

— Qiu Dao Long, the Investigating Censor of Ming, Ming Shilu, 13 January 1521

The Portuguese conquest of Malacca enraged the Zhengde Emperor of China when he received the envoys from the exiled Sultan Mahmud. The furious Chinese emperor responded with force, culminating in a period of persecution of Portuguese in China which lasted three decades.

Among the earliest victims were the Portuguese envoys led by Tomé Pires in 1516 that were greeted with great hostility and suspicion. The Chinese confiscated all of the Portuguese property and goods in the Pires' embassy's possession. Many of the envoys were imprisoned, tortured and executed. Pires himself was said to be among those who died in the Chinese dungeons. Two successive Portuguese fleets bound for China in 1521 and 1522 were attacked and defeated in the first and second Battle of Tamao.

In response to Portuguese piracy and the illegal installation of bases in Fujian at Wuyu island, Yue harbour at Zhangzhou, Shuangyu island in Zhejiang, and Nan'ao island in Guangdong, the Imperial Chinese Right Deputy Commander Zhu Wan killed all the pirates and razed the Shuangyu Portuguese base, using force to prohibit trading with foreigners by sea. Moreover, Chinese traders boycotted Malacca after it fell under Portuguese control, with some Chinese in Java even assisting in Muslim attempts to invade the city.

Relations gradually improved and aid was given against the Japanese Wokou pirates along China's shores. By 1557 Ming China agreed to allow the Portuguese to settle at Macau in a new Portuguese trade colony. The Malay Sultanate of Johor also improved relations with the Portuguese.

=== Successor of Malacca ===
According to the Malay Annals, after the fall of the sultanate, Mahmud Shah commented from his new capital in Bintan, that his former vassal states were no longer paying homage to him. The exiled Mahmud Shah made several attempts to retake the capital but his efforts were fruitless. The Portuguese retaliated and forced the Sultan to flee to Pahang. Later, the Sultan sailed to Bintan and established his capital there. From the new base, the Sultan rallied the disarrayed Malay forces and organised several attacks and blockades against the Portuguese's position. Frequent raids on Malacca caused the Portuguese severe hardship and helped convince the Portuguese that the exiled Sultan's forces needed to be destroyed. A number of attempts were made to suppress the Malay forces but were unsuccessful, until 1526 when the Portuguese razed Bintan. The Sultan retreated to Kampar in Sumatra where he died two years later. He left behind two sons named Muzaffar Shah and Alauddin Riayat Shah II.

Muzaffar Shah was invited by the people in the north of the peninsula to become their ruler, establishing the Sultanate of Perak. Meanwhile, Mahmud Shah's other son, Alauddin succeeded his father and established the Sultanate of Johor. Malacca was later conquered by the Dutch in a joint military campaign in January 1641. The Portuguese fortress, did not fall to the force of Dutch or Johorean arms as much as to famine and disease that decimated the surviving population. As a result of mutual agreement between the Dutch and Johor earlier in 1606, Malacca was handed over to the Dutch.

The fall of Malacca benefited other kingdoms such as Brunei whose ports became a new entrepôt as the kingdom emerged as a new center of trade in the Malay Archipelago, attracting many Muslim traders who fled from the Portuguese occupation after the ruler of Brunei's conversion to Islam.

== Administration ==
| Sultan of Malacca | Reign |
|---|---|
| Parameswara | 1400–1414 |
| Megat Iskandar Shah | 1414–1424 |
| Muhammad Shah | 1424–1444 |
| Abu Syahid | 1444–1446 |
| Muzaffar Shah | 1446–1459 |
| Mansur Shah | 1459–1477 |
| Alauddin Riayat Shah | 1477–1488 |
| Mahmud Shah | 1488–1511; 1513–1528 |
| Ahmad Shah | 1511–1513 |

Malacca had a well-defined government with a set of laws. At the top of the sultanate's hierarchy sat the Sultan who was an absolute monarch. The earlier Srivijayan concept of kingship in which the king's right to rule was based on legitimate lineage still prevailed, and with the coming of Islam, it was reintroduced with the name daulat (sovereignty). Malacca's legal codes identified four main state officials appointed by the Sultan.

Below the Sultan was a Bendahara, a position similar to that of a vizier, who acted as an advisor to the Sultan. It was the highest-ranking office that could be held by any common people in Malacca. The Bendahara was also responsible for ensuring cordial relations with foreign states. Malacca's fifth Bendahara, Tun Perak, excelled in both war and diplomacy. Twice during the reign of Sultan Muzaffar Shah, Tun Perak successfully led Malaccan armed forces in repelling Siamese attacks on Malacca. When Sultan Mansur Shah ascended the throne, acting on Tun Perak's advice, he agreed to dispatch a peace envoy to Siam. Tun Perak also advised the Sultan to marry the daughter of the King of Majapahit, Malacca's traditional enemy.

Next to the Bendahara was a state treasurer, called the Penghulu bendahari. Next was the Temenggung which was comparable to a chief of public police and state security. After the Temenggung was the Laksamana. The Laksamana was the head of the navy and also the chief emissary of the Sultan. He ensured that the Malacca Strait was safe and enforced the Undang-Undang Laut Melaka (Maritime Laws of Malacca). Malacca's most prominent Laksamana was Hang Tuah. At the bottom of this nobility structure were the four Shahbandars ('harbour masters') for the different communities in the port—one focused exclusively on handling the affairs of the Gujarati traders; another was responsible for traders from Southern India, Bengal, Burma and Pasai; a third for traders from Maritime Southeast Asia; and fourth for traders from Annam, China and the Ryukyu Islands. Lesser titled state officials were also appointed. They were known as the Orang Besar. In addition, a governor called the Mandulika oversaw the administration of appanages and territories annexed by conquest.

The sultanate was governed with several sets of laws. The formal legal text of traditional Malacca consisted of the Undang-Undang Melaka (Laws of Malacca), variously called the Hukum Kanun Melaka and Risalat Hukum Kanun, and the Undang-Undang Laut Melaka (the Maritime Laws of Malacca'). The laws as written in the legal digests went through an evolutionary process. The legal rules that eventually evolved were shaped by three main influences, namely the early non-indigenous Hindu/Buddhist tradition, Islam and the indigenous "adat".

== Islam and Malay culture ==
Whether the first ruler of Malacca, Parameswara, converted to Islam is unknown as there is no evidence to suggest that he had. The 16th-century Portuguese writer Tomé Pires explicitly mentioned that Parameswara was succeeded by his son, Megat Iskandar Shah who only converted to Islam at age 72. On the other hand, the Malay Annals noted that it was during the reign of the third ruler Muhammad Shah (r. 1424–1444), that the ruling class and their subjects began accepting Islam. While there are differing views on when the Islamization of Malacca actually took place, it is generally agreed that Islam was firmly established during the reign of Muzaffar Shah (r. 1445–1459).

Islamisation in the region surrounding Malacca gradually intensified between the 15th and 16th centuries through study centres in Upeh, the district on the north bank of the Malacca River. Islam spread from Malacca to Jambi, Kampar, Bengkalis, Siak, Aru and the Karimun Islands in Sumatra, throughout much of the Malay Peninsula, Java and the Philippines. The Malay Annals mention that the courts of Malacca and Pasai posed theological questions and problems to one another. Of the so-called Wali Sanga responsible for spreading Islam on Java, at least two, Sunan Bonang and Sunan Kalijaga, are said to have studied in Malacca. Tomé Pires mentions in his Suma Oriental that the rulers of Kampar and Indragiri on the east coast of Sumatra converted to Islam as a result of Sultan Muzaffar Shah's influence and went on to study the religion in Malacca. The Malay Annals also mentions a number of scholars who served at the Malacca royal court as teachers and counselors to the various sultans. Maulana Abu Bakar served in the court of Sultan Mansur Shah and introduced the Kitab Darul Manzum, a theological text translated from the work of an Arab scholar in Mecca. A scholar by the name of Maulana Kadi Sardar Johan served as a religious teacher to both Sultan Mahmud Shah and his son. In addition to Kitab Darul Manzum, the Malay Annals also mentions the Kitab al-luma' fi tasawwuf ('Book of Flashes'), a tenth-century treatise on Sufism by Abu Nasr al-Sarraj.

Certain elaborate ceremonies that blend Islamic traditions with local culture were also created in the Malacca Sultanate. One example was recorded during the reign of Muhammad Shah. A special ceremony was held that marked the celebration of the 27th night of Ramadan, the Laylat al-Qadr. It began with a daytime procession, led by the Temenggung on elephant-back, conveying the Sultan's prayer mat to the mosque for Tarawih performed after the mandatory night prayers. On the following day the Sultan's turban would be carried in procession to the mosque. Similar ceremonies accompanied the grand celebrations of both Hari Raya Aidilfitri and Hari Raya Aidiladha. Apparently Malaccan Malay society had become so infused with the Islamic worldview that on the eve of the fall of Malacca, warriors at the court requested copies of two Islamic heroic epics, the Hikayat Amir Hamzah and the Hikayat Muhammad Hanafiah, to inspire them in battle the next day.

The rise of Malacca as a centre of Islam had a number of implications. Firstly, Islam transformed the notion of kingship so that the Sultan was no longer viewed as divine, but as God's Khalifah. Secondly, Islam was an important factor in enabling Malacca to foster good relations with other Islamic polities, including the Ottoman Empire, thereby attracting Muslim traders to Malacca. Thirdly, Islam brought many great transformation into Malaccan society and culture, and ultimately it became a definitive marker of a Malay identity. This identity was in turn enriched further through the standards set by Malacca in some important aspects of traditional Malay culture, notably in literature, architecture, culinary traditions, traditional dress, performing arts, martial arts, and royal court traditions. Over time, this common Malay cultural idiom came to characterise much of Maritime Southeast Asia through Malayisation.

== Trade ==
Malacca's tin ingot, photo taken from National History Museum of Kuala Lumpur.

Malacca developed from a small settlement to a cosmopolitan Entrepôt within the span of a century. This rapid progression was attributable to several factors, key among which were its strategic location along one of the world's most important shipping lanes, the Strait of Malacca and the increasing demand for commodities from both the East and the West. Ships from the East bearing goods from China, the Ryukyu Islands, Java and the Maluku Islands would sail in by the northeast monsoon from December to January, while ships leaving for ports along Indian coastline, the Red Sea and East Africa would sail with the southwest monsoon.

There were other ports along the Strait of Malacca such as Kedah in the peninsula and Jambi and Palembang in Sumatra, yet none of them came close to challenging Malacca's success as a centre of international trade. Malacca had an edge over these ports because its rulers created an environment that was safe and conducive for business. Chinese records of the mid-15th century stated that Malacca flourished as a centre for trade on account of its effective security measures. It also had a well-equipped and well-managed port. Among the facilities provided for merchants were warehouses, where they could safely house their goods as they awaited favourable trade winds, as well as elephants for transporting goods to the warehouses. To administer the cosmopolitan marketplace, the traders were grouped according to region and placed under one of four shahbandars.

Malacca had few domestic products with which to trade. It produced small amounts of tin and gold as well as dried fish, yet even the salt for preserving the fish had to be sourced from elsewhere in the region. Basic goods, including vegetables, cattle and fish, were supplied by Malacca's trading partners. Rice, mainly for local consumption, was imported. Much of the mercantile activity in Malacca, therefore, relied on the flow of goods from other parts of the region. Among Malacca's most crucial functions was its role as both a collection centre for cloves, nutmeg and mace from the Maluku Islands and a redistribution centre for cotton textiles from ports in Gujarat, the Coromandel Coast, Malabar Coast and Bengal. Other goods traded in Malacca included porcelain, silk and iron from China and natural products of the Malay Archipelago, such as camphor, sandalwood, spices, fish, fish roe and seaweed. From the coastal regions on both sides of Straint of Malacca came forest products; rattan, resin, roots and wax, and some gold and tin. These goods were then shipped to ports west of Malacca especially Gujarat.

Tin ingots were a trading currency unique to Malacca. Cast in the shape of a peck, each block weighs just over one pound. Ten blocks made up one unit called a "small bundle", and 40 blocks made up one "large bundle". Gold and silver coins were also issued by Malacca as a trading currency within the sultanate.

== Legacy ==
The Malacca Sultanate heralded the golden age of the Malay world and became an important port in the far east during the 16th century. It became so rich that Tomé Pires said "Whoever is lord of Malacca shall have his hands on the throat of Venice.". Within a span of a century, the sultanate left a lasting and important legacy, especially within Malay culture and the History of Malaysia. Malacca was the first Malay Muslim state that achieved the status of a regional maritime power. Despite the existence of earlier Muslim kingdoms such as Kedah, Samudra Pasai and Aru, which also possessed well-established ports, none of them came close in challenging Malacca's success in expanding its territory and influence in the region. Malacca also contributed to the evolution of a common Malay culture based on Islam by incorporating native and Hindu-Buddhist ideas and layered them extensively with Islamic ideas and values. Through its traditions, laws, and royal rituals and customs, the Malaccan court set an example for later Muslim sultanates in the region to follow.

Malacca is important to the modern nation of Malaysia as it was the first centralised polity that consolidated the entire Malay Peninsula under its rule. Because of these roles, Malacca is considered by many to be the spiritual birthplace of Malaysia. After the Sultanate of Malacca fell to Portugal in 1511, Mahmud Shah retreated to Kampar, Sumatra, he left behind a prince named Sultan Alauddin Riayat Shah II who went on to establish the Sultanate of Johor.

The Malacca Sultanate also emerged as the primary base in continuing the historic struggles of its predecessors, Singapura and Srivijaya, against their Java-based rivals. By the mid-15th century, Majapahit found itself unable to control the rising power of Malacca which had begun to gain effective control of the Strait of Malacca and expand its influence to Sumatra. As a major entrepôt, Malacca attracted Muslim traders from various part of the world and became a centre of Islam, spreading the religion throughout Maritime Southeast Asia. The expansion of Islam into the interior of Java in the 15th century led to the gradual decline of Majapahit, before it finally succumbed to the emerging local Muslim forces in the early 16th century. At the same time, the literary tradition of Malacca developed the Classical Malay that eventually became the lingua franca of the region. The advent of Islam coupled with flourishing trade that used Malay as medium of communication, culminated in the domination of Malacca and other succeeding Malay-Muslim sultanates in Maritime Southeast Asia. As noted by certain scholars, the historic Malay-Javanese rivalry in the region, has persisted into modern times, and continues to shape the diplomatic relations between the Malay-centric Malaysia and the Java-based Indonesia.

== See also ==
- List of Sunni Muslim dynasties
- Sultanate of Johor
- Sultanate of Kedah
- Sultanate of Brunei
- Sultanate of Singgora
- Sultanate of Riau-Lingga
