= Abu Syahid Shah of Malacca =

Sultan of the Malacca Sultanate

Raja Sri Parameswara Dewa Shah سلطان شاهد شاه ابن المرحوم سلطان محمد شاه
- 4th Sultan of Malacca
- Reign: Malacca Sultanate: 1444–1446
- Predecessor: Muhammad Shah
- Successor: Muzaffar Shah
- Died: 1446
Names
- Raja Sri Parameswara Dewa Ibrahim Shah
- House: Malacca Sultanate
- Father: Muhammad Shah
- Religion: Islam (formerly); Hinduism

Sultan Abu Syahid Shah ibni Almarhum Sultan Muhammad Shah (died 1446) whose real name was Raja Ibrahim, was the 4th sultan of the Malaccan Sultanate from 1444 to 1446. Despite the fact that Malacca was a Muslim kingdom, Syahid Shah was a practising Hindu. He styled himself as Raja Sri Parameswara Deva Shah. Appointment of Raja Ibrahim as 4th sultan of Malacca was unpopular because of his young age. His predecessor, Sultan Muhammad Shah had allegedly seen the Islamic prophet Muhammad in his dream and converted to Islam. Syahid Shah on taking a Hindu title represented a traditionalist reaction in Malacca against Islam, the new religion. He reigned for only seventeen months, after which he was killed in a plot allegedly conspired by the Tamil Muslim Bendahara (Grand Vizier), (Datuk Seri Nara Diraja Tun Ali), Raja Kassim, son of Muhammad Shah, Tun Perpatih Sedang and Datuk Bendahara Seri Amar Diraja. Syahid Shah was then given the title Abu Syahid, which means "the Martyred King".

== Sources ==
- Modul Latihan Pengajaran dan Pembelajaran Sejarah, Pusat Perkembangan Kurikulum Kementerian Pendidikan Malaysia.
- Malaysia Kita, International Law Book Services, Kuala Lumpur, 2005

Abu Syahid Shah of Malacca House of Malacca Died: 1446
Regnal titles
Preceded by Muhammad Shah	Sultan of Malacca; 1444–1446	Succeeded by Muzaffar Shah
