= Tun Mutahir of Malacca =

Bendahara of the Sultanate of Malacca

Tun Mutahir

7th Bendahara of the Sultanate of Malacca
- In office 1500–1510
- Preceded by: Tun Perpatih Putih
- Succeeded by: Bendahara Lubok Batu Tepok Paduka Tuan

Bendahara Sri Maharaja Tun Mutahir (died 1510) was a famous Bendahara of the Malaccan Sultanate. Of Tamil Muslim ancestry, he was the seventh Bendahara, a post equivalent to a prime minister. Prior to holding the post of Bendahara, he also held the post of Temenggung. He was also an influential Tamil Muslim leader in Malacca who elected Tamil Muslims to important posts in the Malaccan government.

Raja Mudaliar, after learning that a legal opponent had bribed the bendahara into siding with him, employed the assistance of Laksamana Khoja Hassan to spread rumors claiming that Tun Mutahir was scheming to take over the throne.

The Sultan then ordered the execution of Mutahir's family with the exception of Tun Fatimah, Mutahir's daughter whom the sultan desired to marry. Upon realising his mistake, Sultan Mahmud abdicated in favour of his son, Sultan Ahmad Shah.

Tun Mutahir of Malacca Bangsawan of Malacca
Regnal titles
| Preceded by Tun Perpatih Putih | Bendahara of Malacca; 1510-1511 | Succeeded by Tun Hamzah |
