= Raja Mudaliar =

Raja Mudaliar or sometimes spelt Raja Mutheliar was the richest trader in Malacca during the early 16th century CE. He belonged to the Chitty community.

According to Sejarah Melayu, Raja Mudaliar was the Syahbandar (Chief of Port) of Malacca. He was portrayed as a treacherous person who was responsible for concocting false accusations to sow distrust between Sultan Mahmud Shah and his Bendahara Tun Mutahir, resulting in the execution of Tun Mutahir and his whole family. As a result, the Sultan was antagonized and the palace split into factions; this disunity made Malacca vulnerable to the invading Portuguese.
