= Muhammad Shah of Malacca =

Sultan of the Malacca Sultanate

Muhammad Shah سلطان محمد شاه ابن المرحوم سلطان مڬة‌ اسكندر شاه
- 3rd Sultan of Malacca
- Reign: Malacca Sultanate: 1424–1444
- Predecessor: Megat Iskandar Shah
- Successor: Abu Syahid Shah
- Died: 1444; Mecca
- Issue: Abu Syahid Shah; Muzaffar Shah
- Father: Megat Iskandar Shah
- Religion: Islam

Sultan Muhammad Shah ibni Almarhum Sultan Megat Iskandar Shah (died 1444), also popularly known as Raja Tengah or Radin Tengah, was the third sultan of Malacca. He is the son of Megat Iskandar Shah of Malacca. He ruled Malacca from 1424 to 1444. Some sources named the third ruler of Malacca as Sri Maharaja. Some sources also named him as Sultan Mohammad Shah, although different versions suggest that Sultan Mohammad Shah was Raja Tengah's son. He had two sons, Raja Kasim and Raja Ibrahim, the latter succeeding him under the name of Abu Syahid Shah.

Muhammad Shah of Malacca House of Malacca Died: 1444
Regnal titles
Preceded by Megat Iskandar Shah	Sultan of Malacca; 1424–1444	Succeeded by Abu Syahid Shah
