= Tun Perak =

5th Bendahara of the Sultanate of Malacca

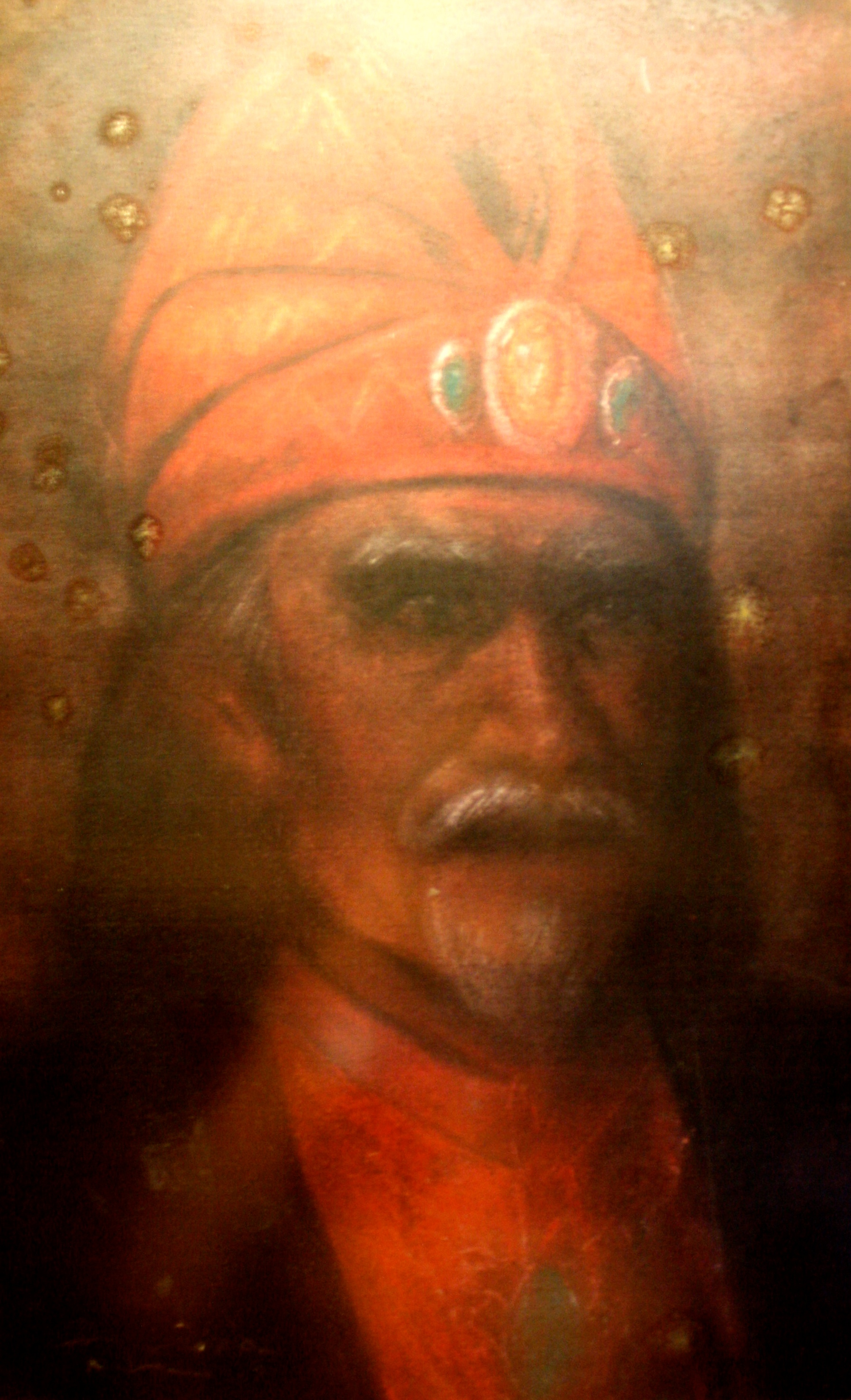

5th Bendahara of the Sultanate of Malacca
- In office 1456–1498
- Preceded by: Sri Nara Diraja Tun Ali
- Succeeded by: Tun Perpatih Putih

Bendahara Paduka Raja Tun Perak (Jawi: بندهار ڤدوک راج تون ڤيراق, died 1498) was the fifth and most famous bendahara, a Malay rank similar to a prime minister, of the Sultanate of Malacca. He served under four sultans (Sultan Muzzafar Shah, Sultan Mansur Shah, Sultan Alauddin Riayat Shah and Sultan Mahmud Shah) from 1456 to 1498. Early in his life, Perak was a soldier-statesman for Malaccan rulers.

Tun Perak was the son of Malacca's first bendahara, Sri Wak Raja Tun Perpatih Besar. In 1445, he was appointed as Malacca's representative in Klang. After a Siamese invasion that began in 1445 that lasted until 1446, another Siamese attack occurred in 1456 when Tun Perak was Bendahara. Tun Perak was also instrumental in colonising Pahang, Terengganu, Johor, Riau, Lingga, Bengkalis, Karimon, Rokan, Siak, Kampar, Jambi, Inderagiri and Aru. The rulers of these governments converted to Islam due to Malaccan influence. Tun Perak was very loyal towards the Malaccan Sultanate. When his son, Tun Besar was killed by Sultan Mahmud Shah's son Raja Muhammad due to a misunderstanding, he did not seek revenge against the sultan. Instead, he requested Raja Muhammad to be crowned elsewhere. The sultan honored Tun Perak's request, therefore Raja Muhammad was made a sultan in Pahang.

He died in 1498 and was replaced by his younger brother Tun Perpatih Putih. His death signified what is widely held to be the beginning of the Malaccan Empire's decline.

== Awards and recognition ==
=== Places named after him ===
Several places were named after him, including:

- Kolej Tun Perak, a residential college at Universiti Putra Malaysia, Serdang, Selangor
- Kolej Tun Perak, a residential college at Universiti Teknologi MARA, Alor Gajah, Malacca
- SMK Tun Perak, a secondary school in Jasin, Malacca
- SMK Tun Perak, a secondary school in Padang Rengas, Perak
- SMK Tun Perak, a secondary school at Jalan Salleh in Muar, Johor Darul Takzim
- SMK Agama Tun Perak, a secondary school in Jasin, Malacca
- SRA Taman Tun Perak, a primary school in Kajang, Selangor
- Taman Tun Perak, a residential area in Cheras, Selangor
- Jalan Tun Perak in Kuala Lumpur
- Tun Perak Tower (formerly Maybank Tower) in Kuala Lumpur
- Jalan Tun Perak in Malacca
- Jalan Tun Perak in Ipoh, Perak

== Bibliography ==
- Ahmad Fauzi bin Mohd Basri, Mohd Fo'ad bin Sakdan and Azami bin Man, 2004. Sejarah Tingkatan 1, Kuala Lumpur, DBP.
- https://web.archive.org/web/20060413202402/http://sejarahmalaysia.pnm.my/

Tun Perak Bangsawan of Malacca
Regnal titles
Preceded by Tun Ali	Bendahara of Malacca; 1456-1498	Succeeded by Tun Perpatih Putih
