= Malay-Acehnese conflicts =

Series of military encounters between the Sultanate of Aceh and various Malay sultanates

Date	1528–1629 (101 years)
Location	Sumatra, the Malay Peninsula, the Strait of Malacca.

Belligerents
Johor Sultanate; Perak Sultanate; Pahang Sultanate; Kedah Sultanate (1619); Aru Kingdom (1613); Patani Kingdom (1619); Portuguese Empire	(Aceh Sultanate) Sultanate of Aceh Supported by: Ottoman Empire

Commanders and leaders
Alauddin Riayat Shah II of Johor (surrendered); Muzaffar II of Johor; Abdul Jalil I of Johor; Ali Jalla Abdul Jalil Shah II of Johor; Alauddin Riayat Shah III of Johor (executed); Abdullah Ma'ayat Shah of Johor; Abdul Jalil Shah III of Johor; Mansur Shah I of Perak; Mukaddam Shah of Perak (POW); Alauddin Riayat Shah of Pahang; Sulaiman Shah II of Kedah; Raja Biru; (Portugal) Nuno Álvares Botelho; (Portugal) António Pinto da Fonseca	(Aceh Sultanate) Ali Mughayat Syah; (Aceh Sultanate) Salahuddin; (Aceh Sultanate) Alauddin al-Kahar; (Aceh Sultanate) Ali Ri'ayat Syah I; (Aceh Sultanate) Sultan Muda; (Aceh Sultanate) Sri Alam; (Aceh Sultanate) Zainul Abidin; (Aceh Sultanate) Alauddin Mansur Syah; (Aceh Sultanate) Ali Ri'ayat Syah II, Raja Buyung; (Aceh Sultanate) Alauddin Ri'ayat Syah Sayyid al-Mukammal; (Aceh Sultanate) Ali Ri'ayat Syah III; (Aceh Sultanate) Iskandar Muda

The Malay-Acehnese conflicts were military engagements between the forces of the Aceh Sultanate and various Malay states and dynasties, fought intermittently from 1528 to 1629 in the Sumatra, the Malay Peninsula or the Strait of Malacca. During the reign of the Sultan Iskandar Muda of Aceh, the Acehnese aggressively expanded its territory before being decisively defeated by the Portuguese.

== Background ==
In the early sixteenth century, the Aceh Sultanate rose from a minor port in northern Sumatra to a powerful maritime kingdom. Under Sultan Ali Mughayat Syah, who reigned from 1514 to 1530, Aceh expanded aggressively, annexing neighbouring states such as Deli, Pedir, Pasai, and Aru. This expansion was driven by ambitions to dominate the northern Sumatran trade routes and to challenge Portuguese Malacca, which since 1511 had become the main European stronghold in the region. Aceh's rulers cultivated ties with the Ottoman Empire, acquiring artillery, firearms expertise, and military advisers. These alliances bolstered Aceh's capability to wage war not only against the Portuguese but also against Malay polities that at certain times were aligned with Portuguese interests, most notably Johor, Pahang, Perak, and Kedah.

The Malay states were themselves deeply interconnected. Johor considered itself the successor to the fallen Malacca Sultanate and often asserted its power in the Strait of Malacca and the Malay Peninsula, making it a consistent target for Acehnese hostility. Pahang was at times under Johor's influence, while Perak was a vital tin-producing region. Kedah, positioned strategically on the north-west coast of the Malay Peninsula, was valuable for its pepper production and its role as a port for regional trade . Over the course of a century, these states would be drawn into repeated wars, sieges, and shifting alliances with Aceh and each other. Meanwhile, both sides of the conflict (particularly Johor and Aceh) frequently fought against the Portuguese, seeking to expel them from the region and conquer Malacca for themselves.

== History ==
=== Course of the conflict ===
==== Early conflicts ====
Tensions between Aceh and Johor began soon after Johor's foundation in 1528 by Sultan Alauddin Riayat Shah II. Johor sought to restore Malay political authority after the fall of Malacca and re-establish control over former Malaccan territories, making it a prime target for Acehnese aggression. Throughout the mid-sixteenth century, Aceh launched raids into Johor-controlled territories and allied Malay states. In 1539, Aceh conquered Aru, prompting a joint Johor–Aru counterattack the following year. The Siege of Aru temporarily expelled Aceh but at heavy cost to all parties.

=== Acehnese conquest of Aru (1539) ===
The Acehnese forces who strengthened by 103 of combining Lancharas and galley with 20.000 soldiers was aheading for conquering Aru kingdom, the forces was led by Heredin Mahomet and the Abyssinian named Mamadecan.The first assault occurred when Acehnese fleet firing their cannons to raiding the Aru defenses, and Acehnese was successful to entered the Aru. After their entrance the Acehnese forces attacked the strongest fort of Aru but this attack was unsuccessful make Acehnese heavily lossed their troops.

The Acehnese decided to besieged the Aru capital and during their sieges the Turkish legion build the tunnels to distratced the Aru and ambushed them, with this strategy the Acehnese forces favored the sieges. The Acehnese forces succeeded to breaking the defense of Aru and conquered it, with this sieges the King of Aru was killed during the battle

=== Johorean invasion of Aru (1540) ===
In 1540 Aru kingdom demanding the Johor Sultanate reinforcements to recaptured their strongest military base in Panecitan river who get conquered by Acehnese in 1539, before Aru requested the Johor reinforcement the Johor decided to make an agreement with Acehnese but get declined. In response the Johor forces who led by Laksamana invading the Aru in mission for liberated Aru from Aceh hand.

The Johor forces with strength 2.000 troops and 4.000 mariners landed on Panecitan River and they bombarded the Acehnese troops who remained stay on fort, this bombardement make the Acehnese forces in berserk conditions and making Johor forces easilty penetrating into the fort. This invasion ended with Acehnese casualties 540 men death (140 Acehnese and 400 Turkish).

=== Acehnese invasion of Johor (1564) ===
After encountered Johor at Aru, in 1564 the Acehnese forces invading the Johor Lama with large forces. This invasion resulted in burning and sack of Johor Lama and capturing Alauddin Riayat Shah II of Johor,with the defeat of Johor, Aru fell to Aceh and was entrusted to Alauddin's son Abdullah.

=== Acehnese invasion of Perak (1575) ===
In 1575 the Acehnese forces invade and subjugated the Perak Sultanate, the Acehnese was killed the Perak Sultan’s who was the kinsman of Johor Sultanate,the military conquest resulted in the Perak who became vassal state of Aceh Sultanate.

=== Later conflict ===
Under Sultan Alauddin al-Kahar, Aceh mounted large-scale assaults on Portuguese Malacca in the 1560s and 1570s. In 1568, the sultan deployed some 15,000 men, including Ottoman-trained gunners and African mercenaries, supported by a fleet of 300 vessels. Portuguese and Johor defenders repelled the siege after weeks of intense fighting, killing thousands of Acehnese. In 1573, Aceh returned with 7,000 men and 25 galleys, but a sudden storm scattered the fleet and the Portuguese–Johor forces again held firm. During this period, Perak was also drawn into the conflict. In 1577, Sultan Mansur Shah I of Perak vanished under mysterious circumstances, widely believed to have been abducted by Acehnese forces. Members of the Perak royal family were taken to Sumatra, consolidating Aceh's influence over the state.

Pahang's strategic location drew Aceh's attention in the late sixteenth century, particularly as Johor exerted influence there. When Johor installed Raja Bujang, later Sultan Abdul Jalil Shah III, as ruler of Pahang, Aceh retaliated with raids and the taking of royal hostages, including members of the Pahang court. These actions reflected Aceh's broader strategy of forcing Malay states into tributary relationships through military pressure and dynastic manipulation.

==== Expansion of Aceh under Iskandar Muda ====
The accession of Sultan Iskandar Muda in 1607 marked the high point of Acehnese military power. Iskandar Muda launched a series of devastating campaigns to subdue Malay states and isolate Portuguese Malacca. In 1613, Aceh invaded Johor with a force of between 20,000 and 40,000 troops and up to 70 ships, capturing Johor Lama, Batu Sawar, and even Singapore. Sultan Alauddin Riayat Shah III was taken prisoner to Aceh, where he died in captivity, and Abdullah Ma'ayat Shah was installed as a client ruler. Around the same time, Aceh conquered Pahang and captured members of its royal family, including its prince, who would later become Sultan Iskandar Thani of Aceh. Kedah also fell victim to Acehnese aggression in 1619, when a fleet of 50 galleys destroyed its fortifications, razed its pepper vines, slaughtered livestock, and enslaved thousands of inhabitants, forcing the state into vassalage. Perak's strategic tin resources became a target the following year. In 1620, Aceh captured Sultan Mukaddam Shah and thousands of his subjects, effectively placing Perak under its control.

==== Decline of Aceh ====
Aceh's momentum began to falter in the late 1620s. In 1628, the Battle of Langat River saw a Portuguese squadron of only 15 half-galleys destroy nearly the entire Acehnese fleet of 100 ships, killing 3,000 men. The following year, Aceh mounted a massive assault on Malacca, but the Portuguese defence, supported by a Johorean force, annihilated the invaders, reportedly killing 19,000 and ending Aceh's bid for total supremacy in the Strait of Malacca.

== Aftermath ==
Aceh's losses in 1628 and 1629 marked a decisive turning point in the century-long struggle. Aceh's naval power was crippled, forcing the sultanate to abandon large-scale offensive campaigns and turn toward consolidation. Iskandar Muda sought to secure his legacy through diplomacy and dynastic marriage, most notably marrying his daughter, Taj ul-Alam, to Iskandar Thani, the former Pahang prince. This union linked the royal houses of Aceh and Pahang, ensuring a smooth succession upon Iskandar Muda's death in 1636.

Perak and Kedah remained under Acehnese influence into the mid-seventeenth century but gradually regained autonomy, aided by Dutch intervention in trade matters. Pahang's integration into the Acehnese royal house gave it a unique position in regional politics, though Aceh's political grip loosened rapidly after Iskandar Muda's death. The rise of female rulers in Aceh and the reassertion of Johor's power shifted the political balance of the Malay world once again. By the late seventeenth century, Aceh had fragmented into semi-autonomous regions, and Johor had emerged as the leading maritime Malay power. The conflicts between Aceh and the Malay states had redrawn political boundaries, devastated populations, and reshaped the trade and diplomatic networks of Southeast Asia.

== See also ==
- Acehnese-Portuguese conflicts
- Malay-Portuguese conflicts
