= Acehnese–Portuguese conflicts =

Series of military encounters between the Sultanate of Aceh and Portuguese Empire

- Part of the Portuguese Battles in the East
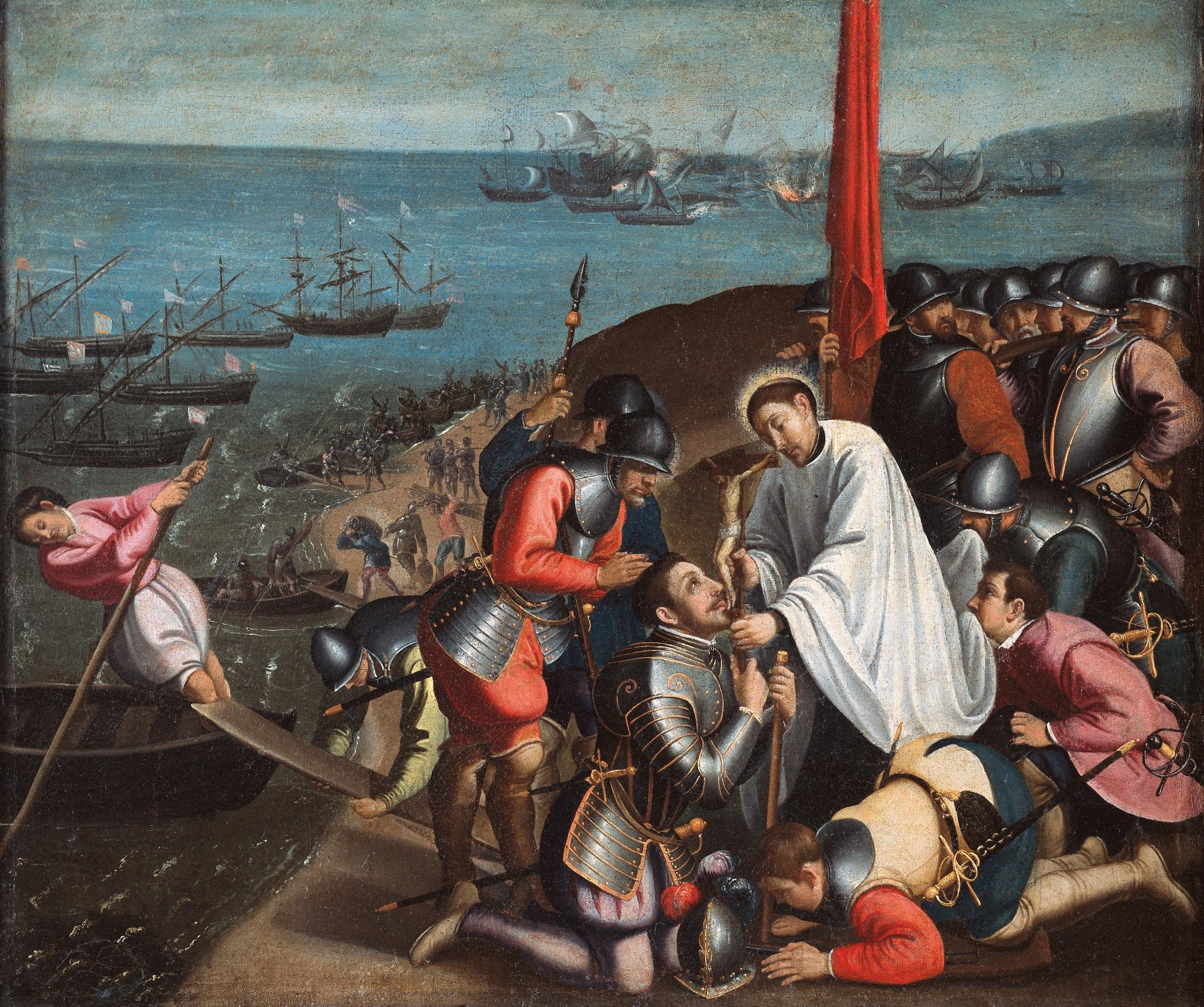
- Francis Xavier Inspiring Portuguese Troops Against the Acehnese Pirates by André Reinoso (1619)
Date	1519–1639 (120 years)
Location	Sumatra, the Malay Peninsula, the Strait of Malacca.

Belligerents
Portuguese Empire; Aru Kingdom; Johor Sultanate; Kedah Sultanate; Samudera Pasai Sultanate (1522–1524); Perak Sultanate; Perlis Sultanate; Patani Kingdom	Aceh Sultanate; Ottoman Empire; Samudera Pasai Sultanate (before 1522); Pedir Sultanate; Kalinyamat Sultanate; Golkonda Sultanate; Dutch East India Company (after 1601)

Commanders and leaders
Gaspar da Costa; João de Lima †; Jorge de Brito †; Manuel Henriques †; António de Miranda de Azevedo; Dom André Henriques; Aires Coelho; Simão de Sousa Galvão †; Manuel Pacheco †; Dom Francisco de Eça; Lionis Pereira; Mem Lopes Carrasco; Dom Luís de Melo da Silva; Estêvão da Gama; Dom Paulo de Lima; Matias Albuquerque; João Pereira †; Bernadim da Silva †; Fernando Pallares †; Nuno Monteiro †; Martim de Castro; Francisco de Miranda Henriques; Diogo de Furtado; Nuno Álvares Botelho; Muzaffar II of Johor; Abdullah Ma'ayat of Johor; Raja Ungu	(Aceh Sultanate) Ali Mughayat Syah; (Aceh Sultanate) Salahuddin; (Aceh Sultanate) Alauddin al-Kahar; (Aceh Sultanate) Ali Ri'ayat Syah I; (Aceh Sultanate) Sultan Muda; (Aceh Sultanate) Sri Alam; (Aceh Sultanate) Zainul Abidin †; (Aceh Sultanate) Alauddin Mansur Syah; (Aceh Sultanate) Tuanku Mahmuddin bin Said Al Latief †; (Aceh Sultanate) Keumalahayati †; (Aceh Sultanate) Ali Ri'ayat Syah II, Raja Buyung; (Aceh Sultanate) Alauddin Ri'ayat Syah Sayyid al-Mukammal; (Aceh Sultanate) Ali Ri'ayat Syah III; (Aceh Sultanate) Iskandar Muda; (Aceh Sultanate) Iskandar Thani; Ratu Kalinyamat

Acehnese–Portuguese conflicts were the military engagements between the forces of the Portuguese Empire, established at Malacca in the Malay Peninsula, and the Sultanate of Aceh, which was a protectorate of the Ottoman Empire, fought intermittently from 1519 to 1639 in Sumatra, the Malay Peninsula or the Strait of Malacca. The Portuguese supported, or were supported, by various Malay or Sumatran states who opposed Acehnese expansionism, while the Acehnese received support from the Ottoman Empire and the Dutch East India Company.

When Aceh began expanding their empire overseas, onto the Malay peninsula, the Portuguese and their allies faced the Acehnese efforts at conquering Malacca and aided other Malay or Sumatran states at resisting Aceh, mainly during the reign of the expansionist Sultan Iskandar Muda.

== Background ==
In the 15th century, three port kingdoms dominated northernmost Sumatra. Pasai had been a Muslim sultanate since the late 13th century, controlling part of the inter-Asian trade that went through the Strait of Malacca. However, by the early 16th century it was wrecked by political turmoil. Another important state was Pedir, now known as Pidie, which was a prominent producer of pepper and befriended the Portuguese since 1509. A third one was Daya (possibly at present-day Calang).

In 1511, the Portuguese governor of India Afonso de Albuquerque captured the great Malay city of Malacca. Malacca was the capital of the most important sultanate in the region and a prosperous trade center, through which all the trade between India, China and Insulindia flowed.

Having gained animosity of the Portuguese, many Muslim merchants moved to Aceh, which also exported high-quality pepper, thereby developing this trade and increasing the revenue of its sultan. Commercial, political and religious hostility would bring Aceh to clash with the Portuguese on various occasions throughout the 16th century, as Aceh attempted to expand its territory in Sumatra, the Malay peninsula and capture Malacca.

== History ==
=== Course of hostilities ===
==== Early conflicts, 1519 ====
The conflicts between Aceh and Portugal started in 1519, when a Portuguese ship under Gaspar de Costa was lost near Aceh and attacked by the Acehnese, killing its crew. Gaspar was captured and later ransomed, and it was not long after this that another ship under Joano de Lima was attacked near Aceh. All its crews were massacred.

==== Battle of Aceh, 1521 ====
In 1521, a Portuguese fleet of 6 ships under the command of Jorge de Brito departed from Goa and anchored in the harbour of Aceh, where they found nine Portuguese who had shipwrecked there, led by João de Borba. Borba told Brito how the sultan of Aceh had attacked and plundered a number of Portuguese vessels who either passed by his shore or were wrecked there. Brito asked the sultan to return the cargo, but as it was not forthcoming they attempted to sack a temple near the city of Aceh with 200 men. They captured a small settlement half-way between the port and the city of Aceh, but were later driven back aboard by an Acehnese counter-attack, having suffered more than 50 dead.

==== Battle of Pedir, 1522 ====
Sultan Ali Mughayat Syah captured the neighbouring Sultanate of Pedir in 1522 by bribing its chief officials. The sultan of Pedir fled with his family to neighbouring Pasai, where the Portuguese held a fort and requested its captain military aid to recover his throne. The captain of the fort dispatched Manuel Henriques with 80 Portuguese and 200 auxiliaries to Pedir by sea while the sultan marched by land with a force of 1000 men and 15 elephants. The Acehnese attacked the Portuguese and killed 35 men including the commander, after which the Portuguese returned to Pasai, suspecting of a trap.

==== Siege of Pasai, 1523–1524 ====
In 1523 Aceh invaded Pasai, a Portuguese ally and after a few months campaign occupied its capital with much slaughter. Turning towards the Portuguese fortress that existed there, they sieged it for several months. The Portuguese, numbering no more than 350 soldiers, many of them sick and wounded, repulsed several assaults, but after gathering a war-council decided to evacuate the fort.

==== Early Conflicts in the Indian Ocean ====
The first Portuguese-Acehnese conflict in the Indian Ocean erupted in 1526 when the Portuguese seized an Acehnese ship bound for Jeddah in the Arabian Sea, selling its cargo in Hormuz. Several years later, subsequent Portuguese attacks on Acehnese vessels off the Arabian coast resulted in the plunder of valuable cargoes.

==== Battle of Aceh, 1528 ====
In 1527, Francisco de Mello sailed in an armed vessel with dispatches to Goa. On his journey, he met a pilgrim Acehnese ship coming from Mecca with a crew of three hundred Acehnese and forty Arabs. They bombarded and sank it from a distance. The Portuguese massacred the surviving crews, prompting the Acehnese to seek retaliation. The Acehnese then attacked and captured the Portuguese galley.

==== Battle of Aceh, 1529 ====
In an attempt to negotiate a treaty of commerce with the Acehnese Sultan, the governor of Malacca dispatched a company with precious gifts and arrived in Aceh, Immediately after they departed, however, some boats followed them and captured them, killing their crews. The governor assumed these ships were lost in accidents.

The Acehnese sultan, wishing to ratify the treaty, wished for some Portuguese presence. The governor dispatched a large ship under Manuel Pacheco alongside several merchants; when they arrived, they were surrounded by a great number of Acehnese boats, which led to suspicion between the Portuguese. An arrow killed Manuel, and the ship was captured. The crew was arrested and massacred.

==== Siege of Malacca, 1537 ====
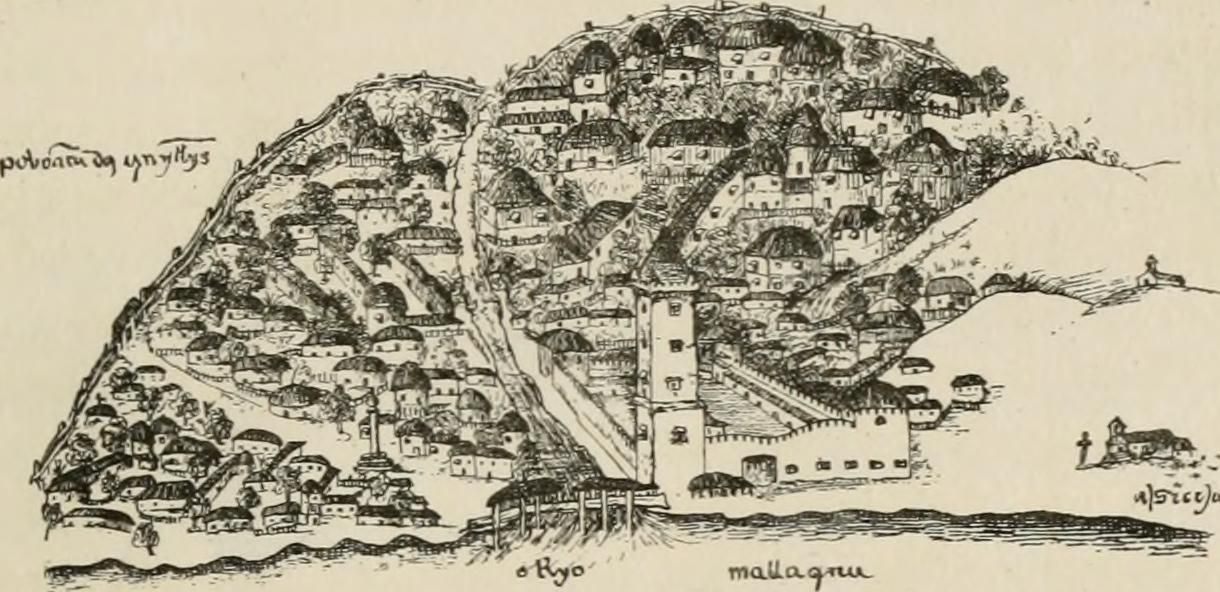
16th century Portuguese sketch of Malacca by Gaspar Correia.

The first attack launched by Aceh on Malacca in September 1537 was led by Alauddin al-Kahar. This surprise attack, supported by about 3000 fighting men, landed at night near Malacca, and began ravaging the outskirts. However, over the following two nights, the Acehnese force was driven out by the Portuguese with a loss of 500 Acehnese.

==== Action of 1546 ====
In 1546, the Acehnese attacked a Portuguese junk belonging to Antonio de Sousa and successfully captured it. Due to this, the Portuguese governor, João de Castro, ordered all Portuguese ships to sail in convoy from India to Malacca.

==== Battle of Perlis River, 1547 ====
Portuguese naval and war banner featuring the Cross of the Order of Christ.

The Sultanate of Aceh attempted in 1547 to attack Portuguese Malacca by surprise under the command of the King of Pedir Bayaya Soora. The large Acehnese fleet, which included 3 galleys, 57 lancharas, 5000 men among sailors and warriors, 300 hulubalangs (ourobalões in Portuguese), plus 80 mercenaries from the Ottoman Empire, of which a number were former Janissary defectors was however detected by the Portuguese, ambushed while landing in the middle of the night and forced to withdraw north.Through the encouragement of renown missionary Francis Xavier the Portuguese assembled a small flottilla and under the command of Dom Francisco de Eça set out after the Acehnese. Having anchored within Perlis River to try and subjugate the region, the Acehnese were cornered within the river. After a stiff but brief fight in December 6, almost the entirety of the Acehnese force was destroyed or captured. The Sultan of Perlis signed an alliance with Portugal and became a tributary vassal in the aftermath.

==== Battle of Qishn, 1561 ====
In March or April 1561, a large 50-gun Acehnese ship manned by 500 Acehnese and other nations, including Turks, Arabs, and Abyssinians, was intercepted by a Portuguese fleet of two galleons and some foists near Qishn. A fierce battle ensued till night in which both Portuguese galleons and Acehnese ships caught fire, two of the Portuguese ships burned and drowned, and both sides suffered heavy casualties. The next day, the consort of the ship was spotted, and the Portuguese successfully forced her to engage; however, at night, the ship slipped away. Tired of chasing their prey, the Portuguese disengaged and cruised in the Red Sea for some time. The remaining crews of the Acehnese ship later arrived in Aden.

==== Battle of Maldives, 1562 ====
In 1565, the Portuguese received word that five Acehnese galleons loaded with pepper, spices and other goods were preparing to depart to Mecca while 9 Ottoman galleys coming to escort them. Hearing this, the Portuguese dispatched a force of 5 galleons and six galleys to Maldives to intercept them. Having learned of their arrival, the commander, Diego Pereyra, divided his forces into two and patrolled the Maldives channels. The Ottomans made a ruse and fired their cannons at several locations; they convinced both patrols that they had encountered the enemy. One Acehnese ship of 400 men ran into one of the galleons, Sao Sebastiao. The galleon began boarding the ship, and fierce fighting ensued. Both ships caught fire and destroyed. The rest of the Ottoman-Acehnese ships successfully evaded the Portuguese.

==== Siege of Malacca, 1568 ====
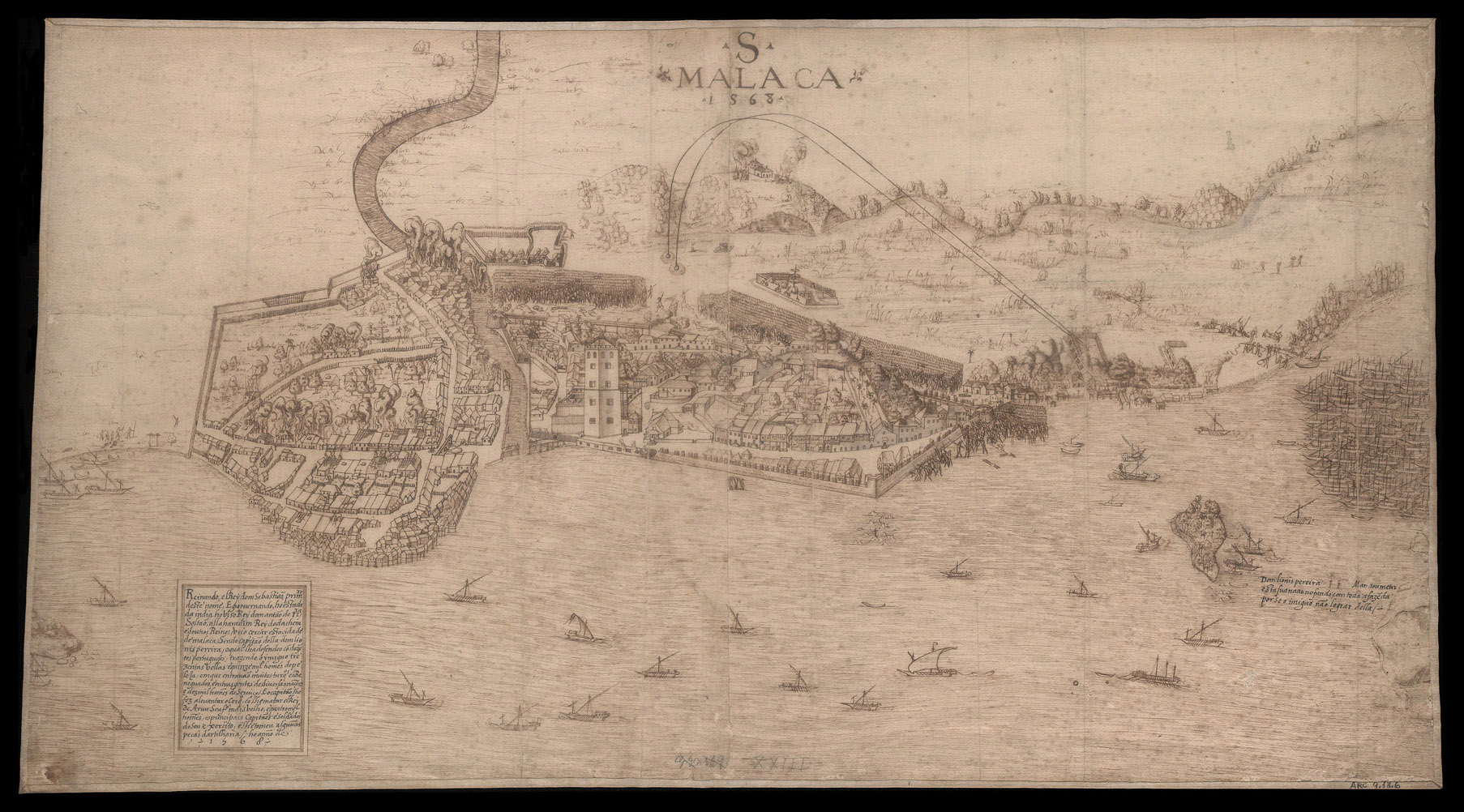
16th century Portuguese sketch of the 1568 siege of Malacca

In 1568 Sultan of Aceh Alauddin attacked Portuguese Malacca. The Ottomans supplied cannonneers to the alliance, but were unable to provide more due to the ongoing invasion of Cyprus and an uprising in Aden.The army of the Sultan was composed of a large fleet of long galley-type oared ships, 15,000 troops, and Turkish mercenaries. The city of Malacca was successfully defended by Dom Leonis Pereira, who was supported by the king of Johor.

==== Battle of Aceh, 1569 ====
The Battle of Aceh was fought in 1569 off the coast of Sumatra between a lone Portuguese carrack (nau, in Portuguese) and an armada of the Sultanate of Aceh, that was about to stage an attack on Portuguese Malacca with 20 galleys, 20 war junks and 200 smaller craft. It ended in Portuguese victory and the withdrawal of the Aceh fleet after suffering heavy losses.

==== Battle of Formoso River, 1570 ====
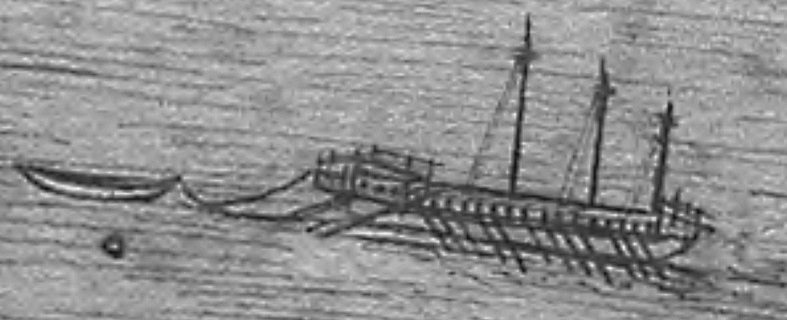
Three masted Acehnese galley.

In November 1570, the Portuguese ambushed and destroyed an Aceh fleet of 100 ships by the mouth of River Formoso to the south of Malacca, killing the prince-heir of Aceh, and thus forcing the Sultan to postpone the attack to a later date. Dom Luís de Melo then returned to India with his forces the following January.

==== Siege of Malacca, 1573 ====
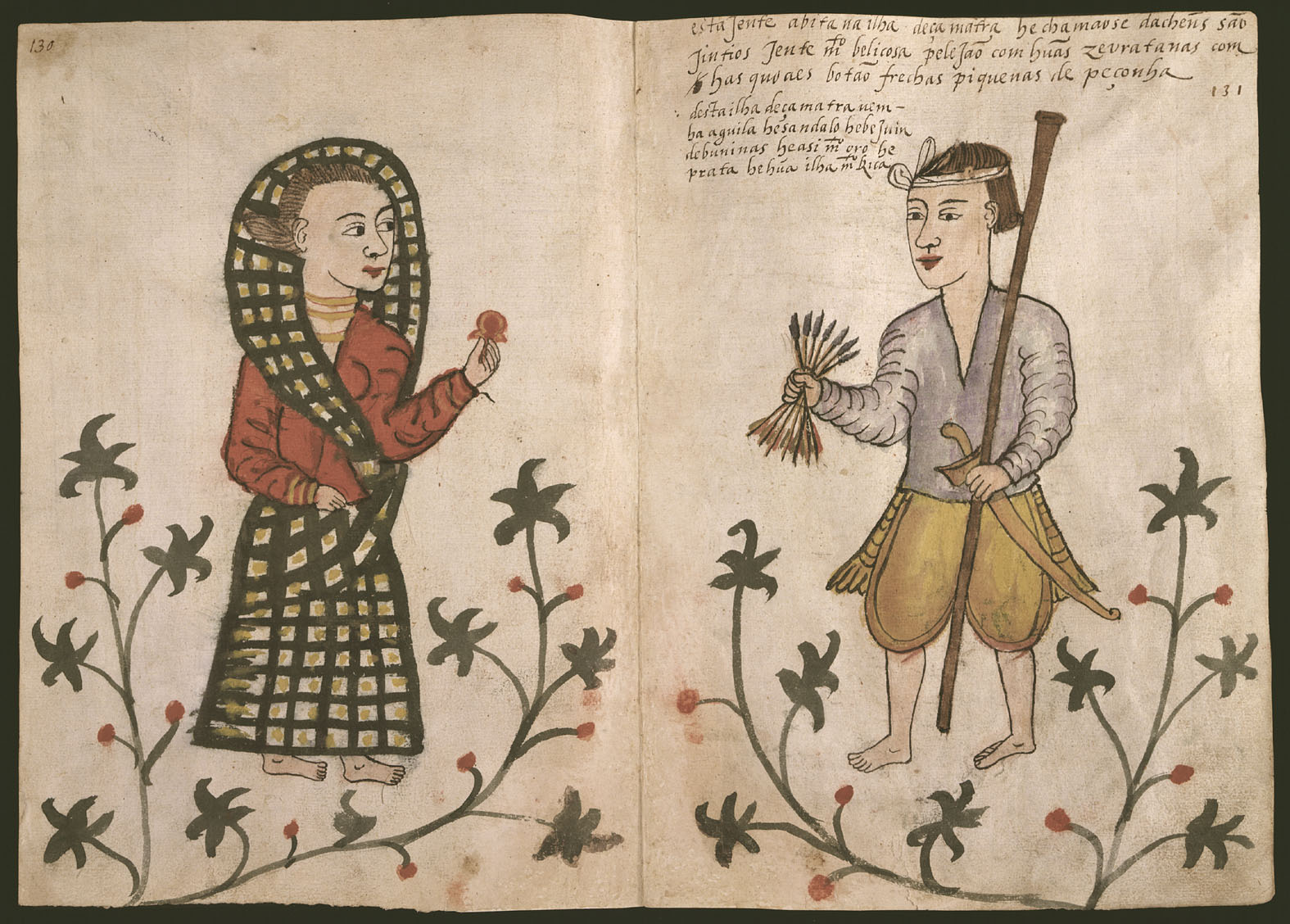
Portuguese watercolour sketch of Acehnese, in the Códice Casanatense.

Portuguese Malacca was scarcely defended in October 1573 as most soldiers were embarked on commercial missions. The sultan of Aceh therefore requested the assistance of the Queen of Jepara in Java to siege it and assembled an armada of 25 galleys, 34 half-galleys, and 30 craft and 7000 men. Aceh had material support from the Sultanate of Golkonda in India.

The Acehnese landed on October 13 south of Malacca and dealt severe casualties to the Portuguese who attempted a sortie. Thereafter they began attacking the fortress with incendiary projectiles, causing several fires but a sudden storm put out the fires and scattered the fleet, and the assault was called off. The Aceh commander then decided to establish a naval base by the Muar River and force the city to surrender through a naval blockade instead, but they were challenged by a Portuguese fleet of a carrack, a galleon, and eight half-galleys under the command of Tristão Vaz da Veiga. Despite having Turkish gunners and cannon, the Acehnese artillery was not overly effective. Once their flagship captured by the Portuguese, the remainder of the Aceh fleet scattered. The Portuguese suffered ten dead.

==== Siege of Malacca, 1575 ====
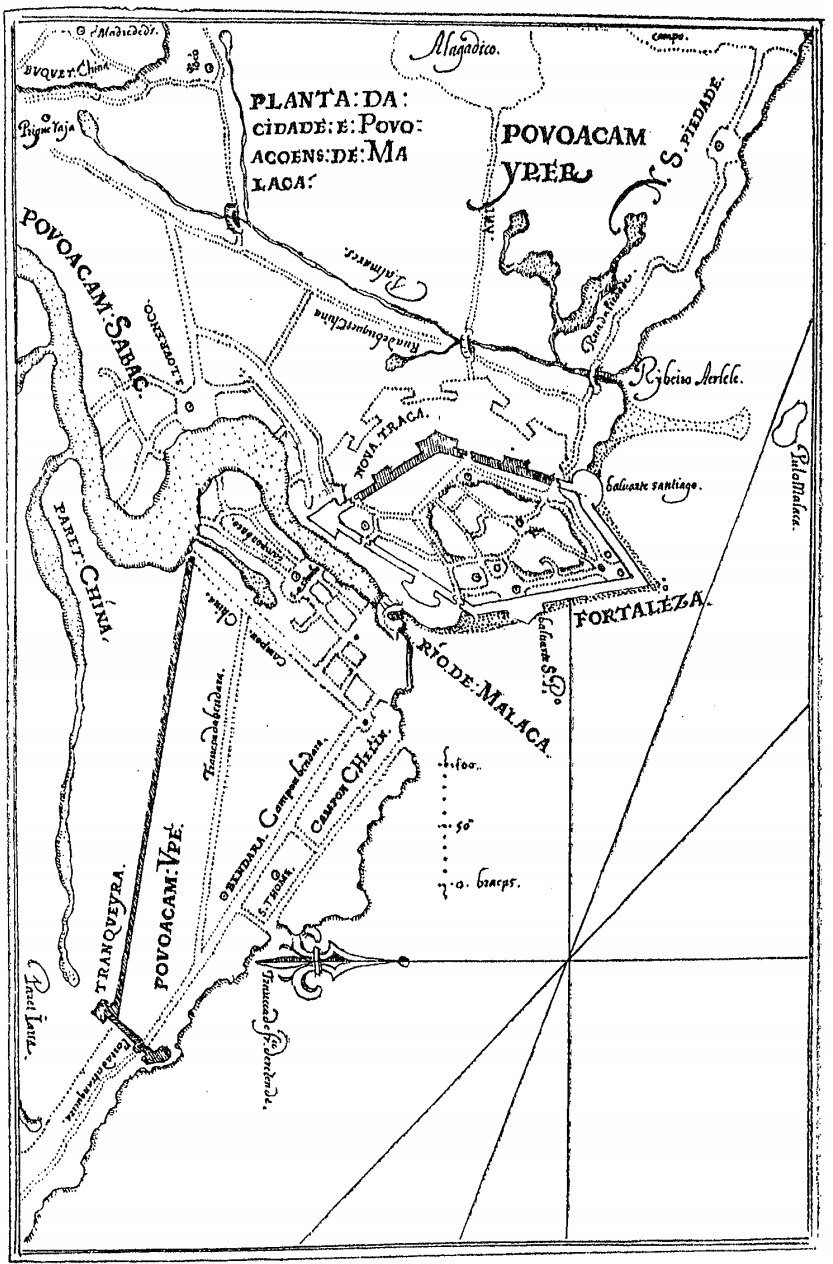
Portuguese map of Malacca.

After Malacca was sieged in 1573 and 1574, the garrison was left decimated, crops destroyed, and foodstuffs and gunpowder in the city nearly exhausted.

In the final day of January 1575, a new Acehnese armada of 113 vessels, once more laid siege to Malacca. The Acehnese defeated the Portuguese vessels led by Joao Pereira, Bernadim da Silva, and Fernando Pallares. They killed 75 Portuguese, including the three captains, and captured 40 prisoners. Five Portuguese escaped by swimming. Within Malacca there were now only 150 Portuguese soldiers to defend it plus the corps of native soldiers; Tristão Vaz realized that to keep them behind the walls could be disadvantageous, as it might hint the enemy of their dwindling numbers. Because of this, he had his last remaining men perform short sorties to fool the Acehnese of their numbers.

Ultimately, the third siege of Malacca was brief: only seventeen days after landing, fearing a trap, the Acehnese lifted the siege and sailed back to Sumatra. In June, Dom Miguel de Castro arrived from Goa with a fleet of a galleass, three galleys, and eight half-galleys to relieve Tristão Vaz as captain of Malacca, along with 500 soldiers in reinforcements.

==== Battle of Johor, 1577 ====
On January 1, 1577, the Portuguese fleet led by Mathias de Albuquerque was intercepted near Johor by the Acehnese fleet on their mission to protect a Chinese junk. The Acehnese fleet consisted of 150 ships and 10,000 men and was led by the sultan Ali Ri'ayat Syah I. The Acehnese were defeated and 1,600 were captured, while the Portuguese only suffered 13 deaths.

==== Battle of Malacca and Johor, 1582 ====
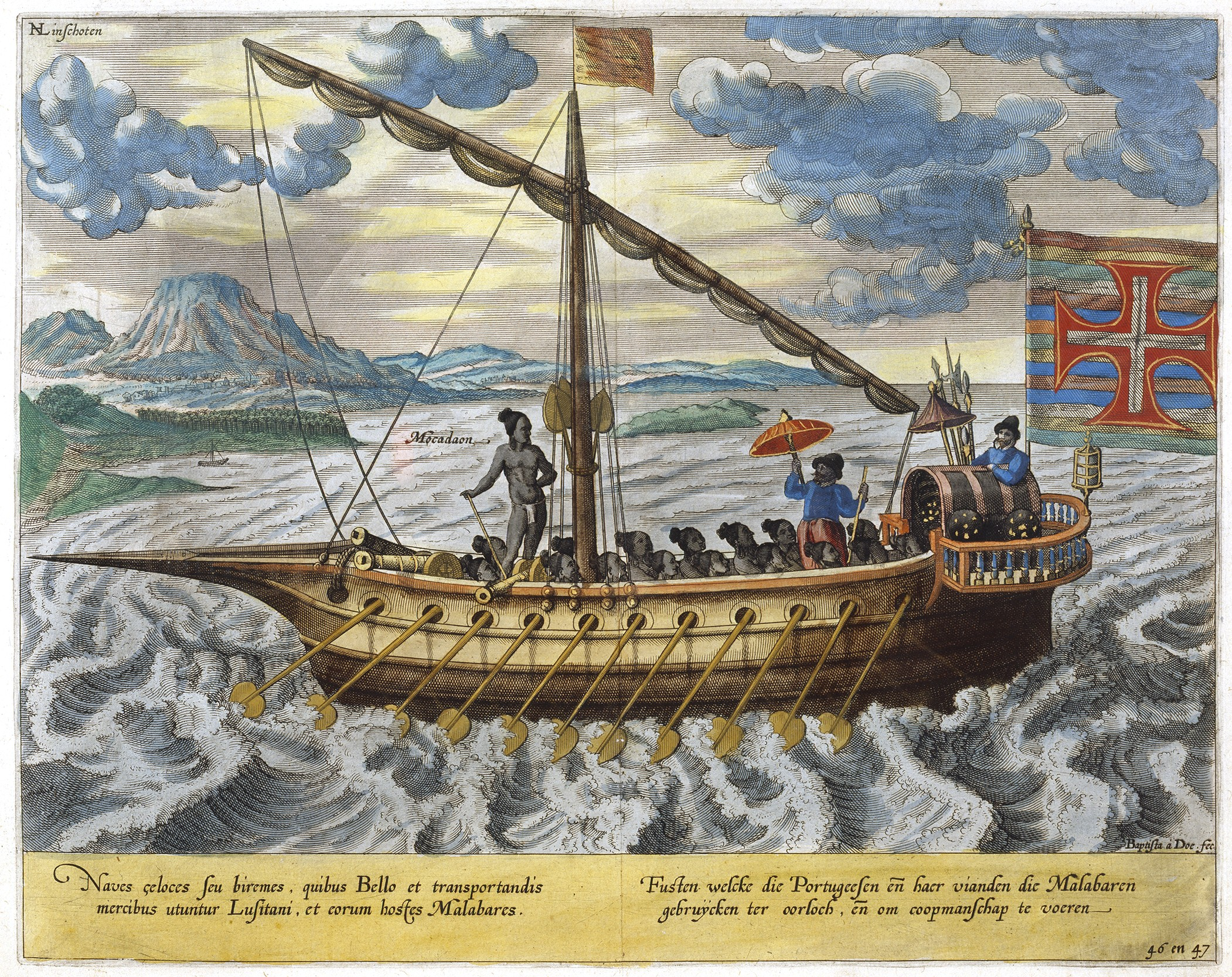
Portuguese light galley.

The Acehnese fleet attacked Malacca in 1582. With a fleet of 150 ships, they intercepted two ships lying in a river and began bombarding them. However, seeing the little damage inflicted, they resolved to burn them. However, the Portuguese successfully diverted them from the burning vessels that were sent to burn them. Later, a Portuguese galliot led by Nuno Monteiro with 50 men engaged the Acehnese fleet, which began boarding it. However, the galliot caught fire, and all on board were killed, including Nuno. The Acehnese, satisfied with this success, then retired to attack Johor.

The Sultan of Johor requested assistance from the Portuguese at Malacca, and 12 ships were dispatched to his aid. The Acehnese were caught unprepared and some of their largest galleys were torched before any resistance could be organized. The head of one of the Acehnese commanders was presented to the sultan of Johore, who had it set on the beach. Struck by their losses, the Acehnese lifted the siege shortly afterwards.

==== Battle of Aceh, 1606 ====
In 1606, the Portuguese Viceroy of India Dom Martim Afonso de Castro organized a large naval expedition to fight the Dutch VOC in south-east Asia and along the way attack the Sultanate of Aceh.

Having landed and tried to attack the capital of Aceh, the Portuguese encountered heavy resistance, and upon receiving news of a Dutch siege on Malacca, Dom Martim withdrew from the campaign.

==== Battle of Bintan (1614) ====
In 1614, the Acehnese forces who ran the Iskandar Muda military campaign encountered the Portuguese fleets in Bintan Island and defeated them, this attacks boosted the confident of Acehnese forces to attacked Portuguese Malacca.

==== Battle of Formoso River, 1615 ====
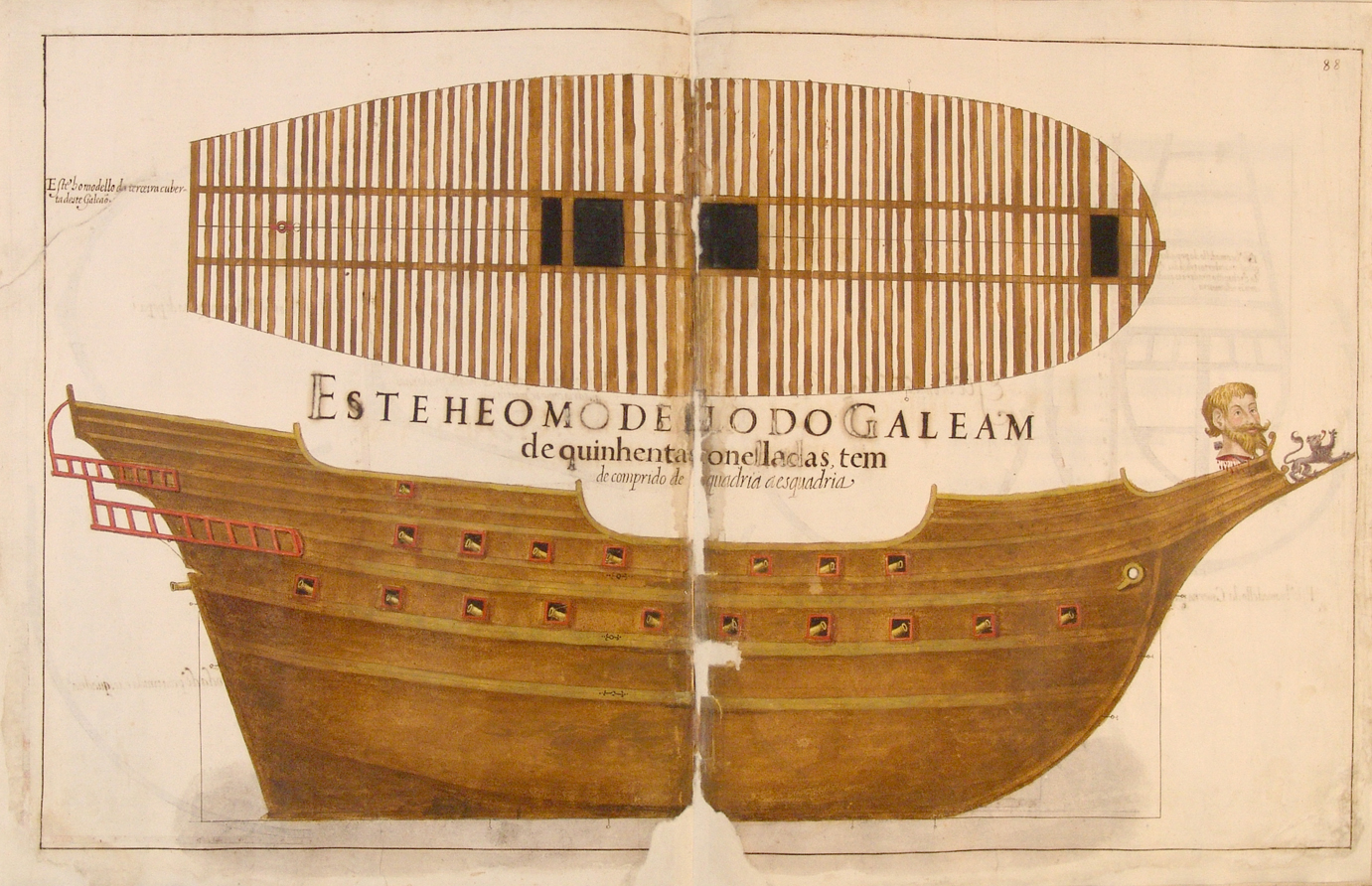
Portuguese technical drawing of a galleon, 1616.

In 1615, Iskandar Muda led a successful campaign against Johor with a large fleet of 100 galleys, 150 ghurab, 250 junks, lancharas, calaluzes and about 40,000 men. On the way back, the sultan intended to attack Portuguese Malacca and anchored his fleet within Formoso River. It was the largest fleet the Acehnese had ever mobilized for an attack against Malacca.

In what was "one of the bloodiest battles the Portuguese fought in south-east Asia", the Acehnese suffered so much damage they were forced to call off their plans and return to Aceh.

==== Battle of Perak, 1620 ====
Aceh conquered Perak in 1620. The Acehnese detached 20 ships that sailed to the vicinity of Portuguese Malacca but were detected by the Portuguese and so they sailed away. The presence of 4 large warships in Malacca demonstrated that the Portuguese were ready to defend their interests in the region against Aceh, Iskandar Muda asked the Dutch for assistance against those ships in return for extension of the Contract in Tiku.

Having gotten information of Aceh activity in Perak, the captain of Malacca dispatched 9 oar vessels under the command of Fernão da Costa to the vicinity of Perak, so as to scout the Acehnese armada and escort a number of Portuguese merchant ships that were expected to arrive. Fernão da Costa attacked a number of Acehnese ships within the river, and then withdrew.

==== Siege of Malacca, 1622 ====
On 4 December 1622, an Acehnese fleet composed of 250 vessels of various categories, was besieging the city of Malacca when it was attacked by a Portuguese armada, numbering no more than 30 vessels, led by Nuno Álvares Botelho. The Lusitanians inflicted a complete defeat on the Muslims, many of their vessels were captured, and among them was a huge galley which had 100 pieces of artillery.

==== Battle of Langat River, 1628 ====
In 1628, the Portuguese at Malacca got reports that an Acehnese fleet had been spotted inside the Langat river. Guessing that the Acehnese expected to go after the city, the captain of Malacca Gaspar Sampaio entrusted Francisco Coutinho to search out for the enemy armada and destroy it.

Francisco Coutinho moved his 15 half-galleys into the river and a fight started. He ordered to board the Acehnese ships that were closer to the mouth of the river, capturing many. The Acehnese having lost many men, decided to desert every single remaining vessel and 3000 of their men were killed, caught or missing.

==== Battle of Duyon River, 1629 ====
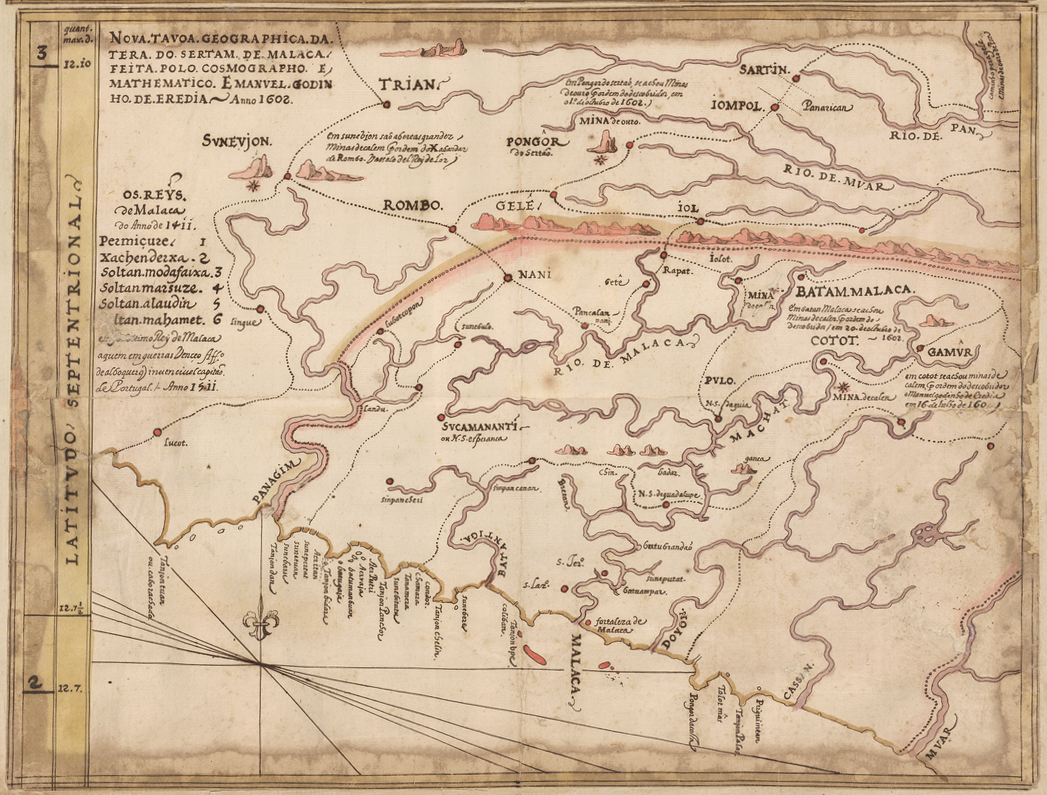
Portuguese map of the region of Malacca, with Duyon river marked.

The 1629 Acehnese attack on Portuguese Malacca came about in the context of growing presence of vessels of the Dutch VOC and the English EIC in the Indian Ocean. Sultan Iskandar Muda of Aceh sought to capture Malacca before either the EIC or the VOC had done so and replaced the Portuguese as overlords of the most important trade emporium in the strategically paramount Strait of Malacca.

The relatively modest Portuguese fleet achieved an absolute victory over the Ottoman-allied Aceh in such decisive ways that not a single ship or man of the invading force sent to conquer Malacca got back to its country. The Sultanate of Perak, a vassal of the Sultanate of Aceh, defected to the Portuguese side on the occasion.

==== Aceh expedition, 1638 ====
When Sultan Iskandar Muda died in 1636, he was succeeded by Iskandar Thani, who sent an ambassador to Malacca to ask for a peace treaty. In September 1638, the Viceroy of India, Dom Pedro de Silva, became agitated by the advances of the Dutch and sent a new envoy to Aceh. The ships departing from Goa with the envoys met the Dutch ships guarding the entrance to the bay as they approached Weh Island. After a fierce battle, the Portuguese managed to break through the Dutch ships. Although the Acehnese had requested a peace treaty, they captured the Portuguese who landed and massacred them. Out of 60 Portuguese killed, only the ambassador, Francisco de Sousa de Castro survived the captivity. He was imprisoned for two years and eight months. This incident outraged the Portuguese, however no military response was launched due to the war with the Dutch.

== Aftermath ==
The opposition of Muslim traders to the Portuguese made them move to Aceh. With the Acehnese capture of Pedir and Pasai, it flourished with traders, leading to a large decrease in merchants coming to Malacca. The threat posed by the Acehnese to the Portuguese was serious as it significantly undermined Portuguese ambitions, who wanted to enforce a trade monopoly in the Indian Ocean and desiring to set the prices for themselves. During the years 1554–1567, the Portuguese attempted to stop the Acehnese trade with the Red Sea; however, these expeditions clearly failed in their purpose.

The Acehnese never succeeded in capturing Malacca, this was due to their guns, warships, and military strategy. The rapid development of technology by the Portuguese gave them an advantage because their main power lied in their ships and cannons. The Acehnese warships never used iron for construction, unlike Portuguese vessels, leaving them more frail than the Portuguese carracks. Acehnese offensives during the reign of Ali Mughayat Syah and his successor Salahuddin ultimately achieved nothing of consequence, nor did those of 1568 and 1575 during the reign of Alauddin al-Kahar. The attacks suffered by the Portuguese ultimately did not prevent them from carrying on their trade operations from Malacca as usual.

The Battle of Duyon river proved to be a decisive engagement that ended aggressive Acehnese expansionism and started a period of internal dispute and decline in Aceh. Aceh never again represented a threat to Malacca. In subsequent years after the disaster of 1629, Aceh external policy as well as internal theological doctrine would undergo deep changes, reflecting a society in turmoil. Iskandar Muda died in 1637, and the brief reign of his successor was marked by religious turmoil and dispute. He was reluctant to aid the Dutch attack Portuguese Malacca. When a Dutch VOC embassy arrived in Aceh on June 27, 1639, to discuss a joint attack against Portuguese Malacca, it received prevarication from Iskandar Thani, who wished to settle affairs on the Malay peninsula first, and the embassy left in September 5. He was in turn succeeded by a daughter of Iskandar Muda, who did not share her fathers appetite for expansionism, which probably reflected the mood in Aceh after the 1629 disaster. Aceh remained an independent, stable, and wealthy kingdom in the end of 17th century Although Aceh's political, economic and military sphere of influence shrunk as a result of the incursions of the VOC and the revival of local rivals (particularly Johor). During her reign, Aceh shrank till it consisted of only to the northern part of Sumatra.

== See also ==
- Portuguese Malacca
- Luso-Asians
- Portuguese military history
- Malay-Portuguese conflicts
- Ottoman–Portuguese conflicts (1538–1560)
- Ottoman–Portuguese conflicts (1586–1589)
- Sinhalese-Portuguese conflicts
- Ottoman embassy to Aceh
- Acehnese conquest of Perak
- Acehnese invasion of Johor
