= Zainul Abidin of Aceh =

Zainul Abidin

Sultan of Aceh Sultanate
- Reign: 1579
- Predecessor: Sri Alam
- Successor: Alauddin Mansur Syah
- Born: Banda Aceh, Aceh Sultanate
- Died: 5 October 1579; Banda Aceh, Aceh Sultanate
- House: Meukuta Alam
- Father: Sultan Abdullah Raja Aru, son of Alauddin al-Kahar

Sultan Zainul Abidin (died 5 October 1579) was the seventh sultan of Aceh in northern Sumatra. His reign was the last of three brief ones in the year 1579.

Zainul Abidin was the son of Sultan Ghori alias Abdullah, who was the vassal ruler of Aru (Deli) and died in battle in 1568. He was the grandson of Sultan Alauddin al-Kahar. After the rapid deaths of the sultans Ali Ri'ayat Syah I, Sultan Muda and Sri Alam, he was placed on the throne of Aceh in 1579. However, according to the chronicles he was only interested in pleasures and especially enjoyed animal fights and life-and-death fights between humans. It was even alleged that he had no appetite before he had seen blood flowing. He also behaved in a tyrannical way towards his uleëbalangs (chiefs). The chiefs therefore resolved to get rid of him. The plotters put him on an elephant and brought him to Makota Alam where he was murdered. This happened on 5 October 1579. He was succeeded by Alauddin Mansur Syah who did not belong to the old sultan's family.

== Literature ==
- Djajadiningrat, Raden Hoesein (1911) 'Critisch overzicht van de in Maleische werken vervatte gegevens over de geschiedenis van het soeltanaat van Atjeh', Bijdragen tot de Taal-, Land- en Volkenkunde, 65, pp. 135–265.
- Encyclopaedie van Nederlandsch-Indië (1917), Vol. 1 ('s Gravenhage & Leiden: M. Nijhoff & Brill).
- Iskandar, Teuku (1958) De Hikajat Atjeh ('s Gravenhage: M. Nijhoff).

Preceded by Sri Alam	Sultan of Aceh Sultanate; 1579	Succeeded by Alauddin Mansur Syah
