= Battle of Langat River =

- Part of Acehnese–Portuguese conflicts
Date	1628
Location	Langat River, Malay Peninsula (present day Selangor, Malaysia)
Result	Portuguese victory

Belligerents
Portuguese Empire	Aceh Sultanate

Commanders and leaders
Dom Francisco Coutinho	King of Dely

Strength
15 half-galleys.	100 ships: 35 galleys

Casualties and losses
Few	99 vessels 3,000 men 800 guns

The Battle of Langat River was an armed encounter between a fleet of the Portuguese Empire and the Sultanate of Aceh, within the Langat River in the Malay peninsula in 1628. The Portuguese were victorious.

== The battle ==
Sometime after late May or early June, Portuguese command at Malacca received reports that an Acehnese armada had been spotted within the Langat River. Anticipating that the Acehnese intended to attack the city, the captain of Malacca Gaspar de Melo de Sampaio tasked Dom Francisco Coutinho to seek out the fleet and destroy it, with 15 half-galleys.

The Portuguese found the Acehnese ships heavily fortified by the banks of Langat River. Nevertheless, Coutinho moved his oarships into the river and after firing a salvo of artillery and muskety grappled and boarded the Acehnese vessels closest of the mouth of the river. At the end of a stiff struggle, having suffered heavy losses, the Acehnese lost or abandoned almost all of their ships, 3000 men killed, captured or missing, and 800 guns captured by the Portuguese.

== See also ==
- Battle of Duyon River
- Battle of Jambi
