= Sri Alam =

Sri Alam Firman Syah سري عالم فيرمن شاه

Sultan of Aceh Sultanate
- Reign: 1579
- Predecessor: Sultan Muda
- Successor: Zainul Abidin

Raja Pariaman (vassal)
- Reign: ?-1575
- Predecessor: Raja Muda
- Successor: ?
- Born: Banda Aceh, Aceh Sultanate
- Died: 1579; Banda Aceh, Aceh Sultanate
- Spouse: Raja Dewi of Indrapura
- Issue: Syekh Muhyuddin Fadlil Syah
- House: Meukuta Alam
- Father: Alauddin al-Kahar
- Religion: Islam

Sri Alam Firman Syah, also known as Sultan Mughal (d. 1579), was the sixth sultan of Aceh in northern Sumatra. He led a very brief reign in the year 1579 before being deposed and killed.

Sultan Mughal was one of the five sons of Sultan Alauddin al-Kahar. Before his accession he governed Priaman, a port town on the west coast of Sumatra. He was married to Raja Dewi, a daughter of Munawwar Syah of the Indrapura kingdom. When his elder brother Ali Ri'ayat Syah I died in 1579, he was briefly succeeded by his infant son Sultan Muda. The latter soon died, and the throne went to Sultan Mughal who took the reign name Sultan Sri Alam. According to the chronicle Hikayat Aceh, he was excessively generous, especially giving away riches to the uleëbalangs (chiefs) of Barus, another port town on the west coast. Since the treasury was emptied, two grandees of the kingdom called Maharaja and Malik az-Zahir found him unsuited and deposed him after a very brief reign. The chronicle Bustanus Salatin describes him bad-tempered and unfit to rule, and was therefore deprived of his throne as well as his life. He was succeeded by his nephew Zainul Abidin. He was the progenitor of the later sultans of Indrapura. According to a much later genealogy he had a son, Syekh Muhyuddin Fadlil Syah, whose great-granddaughter ruled Aceh as Kamalat Syah (1688–1699).

== Literature ==
- Djajadiningrat, Raden Hoesein (1911) 'Critisch overzicht van de in Maleische werken vervatte gegevens over de geschiedenis van het soeltanaat van Atjeh', Bijdragen tot de Taal-, Land- en Volkenkunde, 65, pp. 135–265.
- Hasjmy, A (1977) 59 tahun Aceh merdeka dibawah pemerintahan ratu (Jakarta: Bulan Bintang).
- Iskandar, Teuku (1958) De Hikajat Atjeh ('s Gravenhage: M. Nijhoff).
- Kathirithamby-Wells, Jeyamalar (1976) 'The Inderapura Sultanate: The Foundations of Its Rise and Decline, From the Sixteenth to Eighteenth Centuries', Indonesia 21.

Preceded by Sultan Muda	Sultan of Aceh Sultanate; 1579	Succeeded by Zainul Abidin
