= Iskandar Muda =

Sultan of Aceh

Iskandar Muda سلطان إسكندر مودا
- Sultan of the Aceh
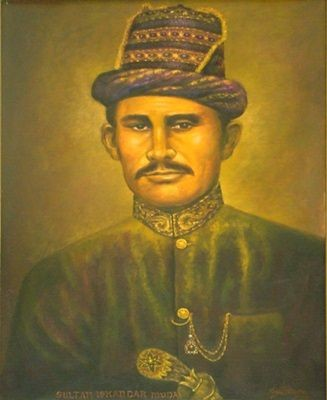
- Sultan Iskandar Muda's Portrait

Sultan of Aceh
- Reign: 4 April 1607 – 27 December 1636
- Predecessor: Ali Ri'ayat Syah III
- Successor: Iskandar Thani
- Born: 1583; Banda Aceh, Aceh Sultanate (now Indonesia)
- Died: 27 December 1636 (aged 52–53); Banda Aceh, Aceh Sultanate (now Indonesia)
- Spouse: Kamaliah of Pahang (Putroe Phang)
- Issue: Crown Prince Meurah Pupok; Putri Sri Alam; Raja Abdul Jalil Shah I of Asahan
Regnal name
- Perkasa Alam Darmawangsa Tun Pangkat Johan Berdaulat Zilullahi Fil Alam Paduka Seri Sultan Iskandar Muda Meureuhom Meukuta Alam
- House: Meukuta Alam
- Father: Sultan Mansyur Syah
- Mother: Puteri Raja Inderabangsa
- Religion: Sunni
- National Hero of Indonesia; S.K. Presiden No. 077/TK/Tahun 1993, date September 14, 1993

Iskandar Muda (1583? – 27 December 1636) was the twelfth Sultan of Aceh, under whom the sultanate achieved its greatest territorial extent, holding sway as the strongest power and wealthiest state in the western Indonesian archipelago and the Strait of Malacca.

"Iskandar Muda" literally means "young Alexander," and his conquests were often compared to those of Alexander the Great. In addition to his notable conquests, during his reign, Aceh became known as an international centre of Islamic learning and trade. He was the last Sultan of Aceh who was a direct lineal male descendant of Ali Mughayat Syah, the founder of the Aceh Sultanate. Iskandar Muda's death meant that the founding dynasty of the Aceh Sultanate, the House of Meukuta Alam died out and was replaced by another dynasty.

== Early life ==
The future Iskandar Muda was born in about 1583. His father was Mansur Syah, son of Sultan Abdul Jalil, son of the third Sulṭān of the Acèh Darussalam, Alauddin al-Kahar. His mother Puteri Raja Inderabangsa was the daughter of the tenth Sultan Alauddin Ri'ayat Syah Sayyid al-Mukammal. Therefore, through his parentage he combined the two branches of the Acehnese sultan's dynasty. His childhood and youth are described at great length in the Hikayat Aceh, which extols his personal qualities. He was known under a number of names and titles, especially Perkasa Alam, which was also the name he used after his accession ("Iskandar Muda" is however not a posthumous name as sometimes suggested since it occurs on his coins). In about 1605 he fell out with his uncle, Sultan Ali Ri'ayat Syah III, and fled to Pidië where another uncle, Husain, was the vassal ruler. Together they planned a rebellion against Sultan Ali. Perkasa Alam was put in command of the Pidië troops, but in the end they refused to fight and Perkasa Alam was imprisoned by the sultan. However, when the Portuguese invaded Aceh in 1606 he was let out of prison and distinguished himself in the fight against the infidels. The invasion force was beaten back and withdrew, and Perkasa Alam rose in esteem at the court. When Sultan Ali suddenly died on 4 April 1607, Perkasa Alam was able to secure the throne on the same day. He imprisoned his other uncle Husain and later had him killed.

== Conquest and reign ==
Alam Peudeueng, the flag of the Aceh Sultanate, inspired by the Ottoman flag.

The successes of Iskandar Muda were based on his military strength. His armed forces consisted of a navy of heavy galleys each with 600–800 men, a cavalry using Persian horses, an elephant corps, conscripted infantry forces and more than 2000 cannons and guns (of both Sumatran and European origin). Upon gaining power, he began consolidating control over northern Sumatra. In 1612 he conquered Deli, and in 1613 Aru and Johor. Upon the conquest of Johor, its sultan, Alauddin Riayat Shah III, and other members of the royal family were brought to Aceh, along with a group of traders from the Dutch East India Company. However, Johor was able to expel the Acehnese garrison later that year, and Iskandar Muda was never able to assert permanent control over the area. Johor further built an alliance with Pahang, Palembang, Jambi, Inderagiri, Kampar and Siak against Aceh.

The conquest of Iskandar Muda, 1608–1637.

Iskandar Muda's campaigns continued, however, and he was able to defeat a Portuguese fleet at Bintan in 1614. In 1617 he conquered Pahang and carried its sultan Ahmed Syah to Aceh, and thus achieved a foothold on the Malayan peninsula.This conquest was followed by Kedah in 1619, in which the capital was laid waste and the surviving inhabitants were brought to Aceh. A similar capture of Perak occurred in 1620, when 5,000 people were captured and left to die in Aceh. He again sacked Johor in 1623 and took Nias in 1624/5. At this point Aceh's strength seriously threatened the Portuguese holding of Melaka. In 1629, he sent several hundred ships to attack Melaka, but the mission was a devastating failure. According to Portuguese sources, all of his ships were destroyed along with 19,000 men. He however only managed to capture two major port cities in Melaka. After this loss, Iskandar Muda launched only two more sea expeditions, in 1630/1 and 1634, both to suppress revolts in Pahang and to firmly establish Islam in the region. His sultanate maintained control over northern Sumatra, but was never able to gain supremacy in the strait or expand the empire to the rich pepper-producing Inderapura Kingdom and the region of Lampung on the southern part of the island, which was under the control of the sultanate of Banten. Iskandar Muda was also known to be cruel as he devised torture techniques and caused humiliation to those who failed to please him. In one cockfighting match, a noble who won the match eventually suffered a humiliating death, while generals who failed in their exploits had been on occasion forced to "eat a plate of turds".

As the Sultans in Aceh exert their symbol of power prestige in elephant possessions, Iskandar Muda has about 900 elephants in possession, while his son-in-law, Iskandar Thani, possessed one thousand elephants. It is recorded that Sultanate of Aceh during reign of Iskandar Muda has managed relationship with the Mughal Empire, as both were exchanging gifts, with one of the presents from Iskandar Muda sending emperor Shah Jahan with twelve elephants, while later, his daughter, Sultanah Safiatuddin, also presenting gift to successor of Shah Jahan, Aurangzeb, with eight elephants.

== Economy and administration ==
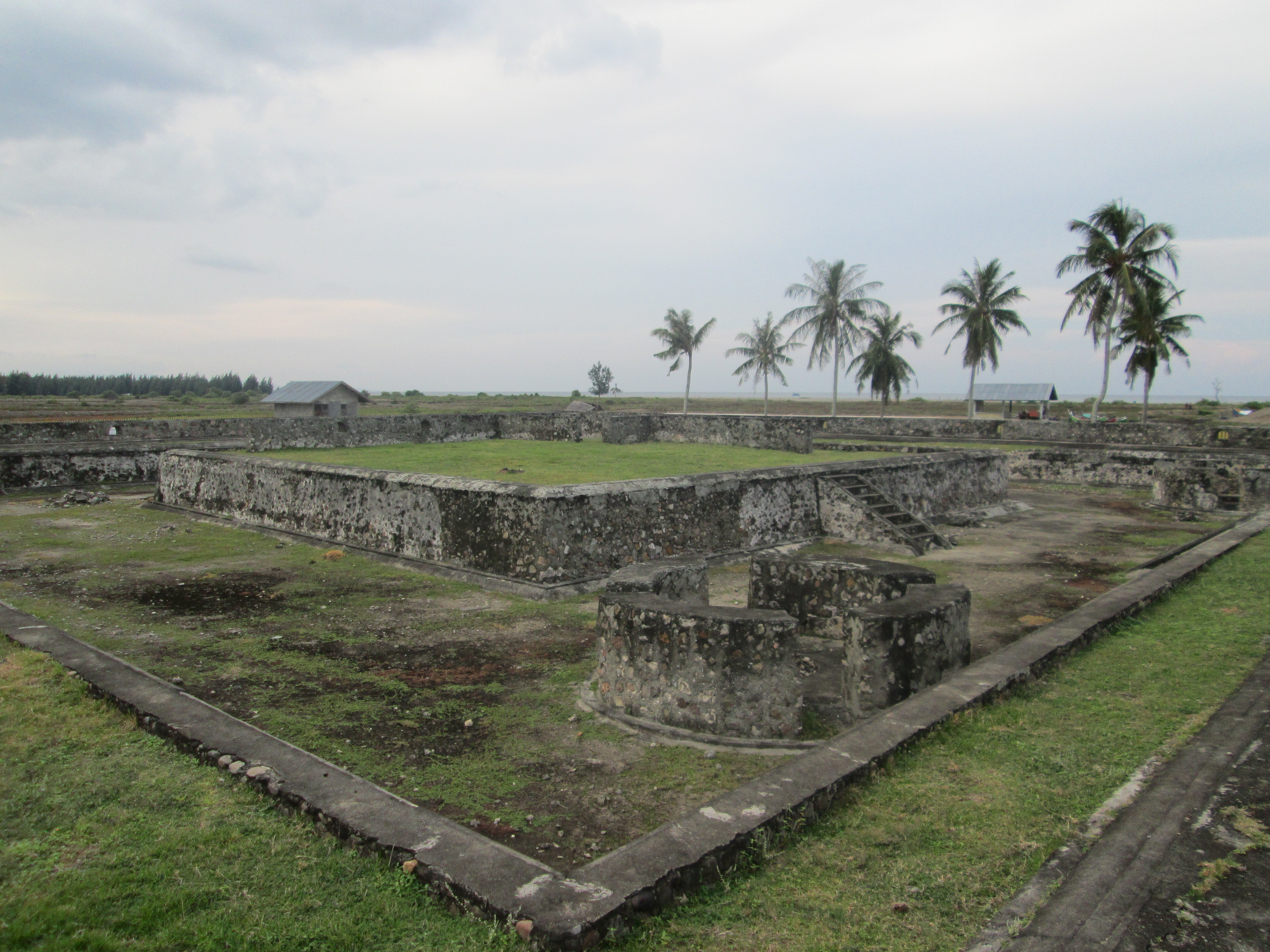
Iskandar Muda Fort in Krueng Raya, Aceh Besar Regency

The economic foundations of the sultanate was the spice trade, especially in pepper. The conflicts between Aceh and Johor and Portuguese Malacca, as well as the numerous pepper-producing ports in the sultanate's domain, were the main causes of the military conflict. Other major exports included cloves and nutmegs, as well as betel nuts, whose narcotic properties bypassed the Muslim prohibition of alcohol. Exports, encouraged by the Ottoman Sultans as an alternative to the "infidel" (i.e. Portuguese)-controlled route around Africa, added to the wealth of the sultanate. Iskandar Muda also made shrewd economic decisions that supported growth, such as low interest rates and the widespread use of small gold coins (mas). However, like other sultanates in the area it had trouble compelling the farms in the hinterland to produce sufficient excess food for the military and commercial activities of the capital. Indeed, one of the aims of Iskandar Muda's campaigns was to bring prisoners-of-war who could act as slaves for agricultural production.

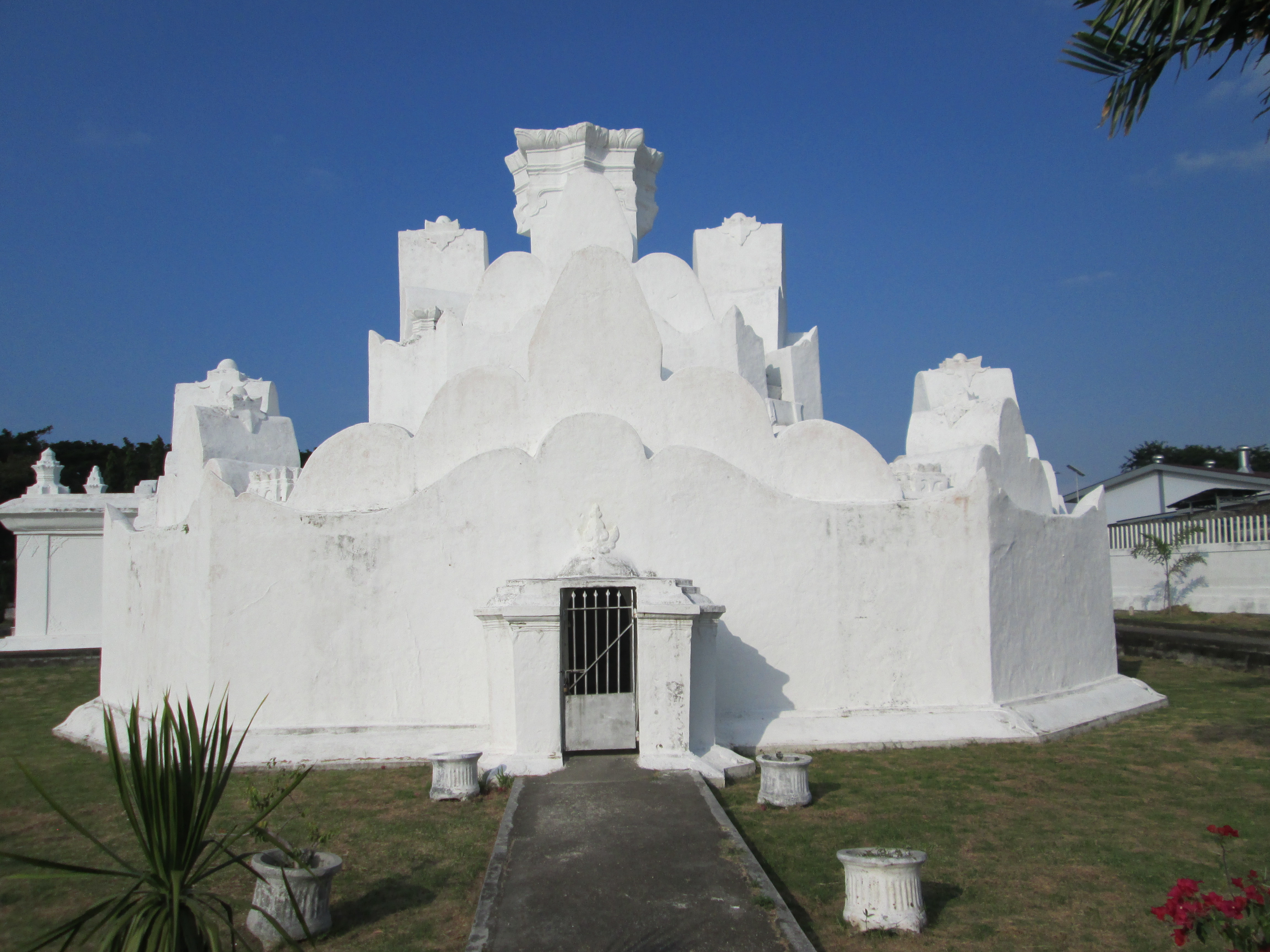
Gunongan built by Sultan Iskandar Muda to his wife, Putroe Phang from Pahang

He was known as a centralizing leader who was intolerant of private trade and adopted a policy of monopolizing the court as the primary contact person with foreigners that were able to establish important terms of trade. He adopted a more predictable legal process and was able to amass a large fortune and a powerful army. One reason for Iskandar Muda's success, in contrast to the weaker sultans who preceded and succeeded him, was his ability to suppress the Acehnese elite, known as the orang kaya ("powerful men"). Through the royal monopoly on trade, he was able to keep them dependent on his favour. The orang kaya were forced to attend court where they could be supervised, and were prohibited from building independent houses, which could be used for military purposes or hold cannons. He sought to create a new nobility of “war leaders” (Malay language: hulubalang; Acehnese: uleëbalang), whom he gave districts (mukim) in feudal tenure. After his reign, however, the elite often supported weaker sultans, to maintain their own autonomy. He also sought to replace the Acehnese princes with royal officials called panglima, who had to report annually and were subject to periodic appraisal. An elite palace guard was created, consisting of 3,000 women. He passed legal reforms which created a network of courts using Islamic jurisprudence. His system of law and administration became a model for other Islamic states in Indonesia.

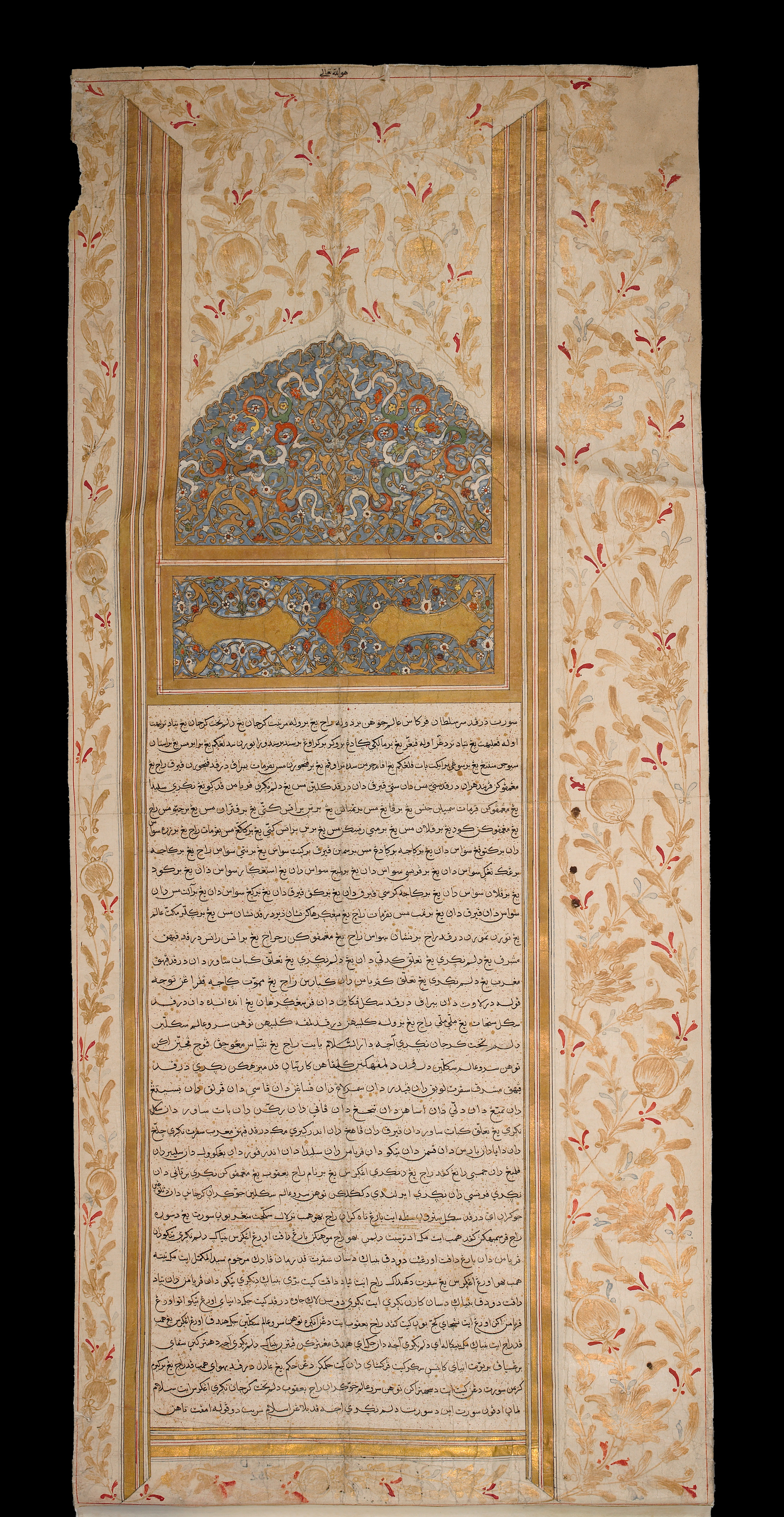
Letter from Iskandar Muda to James I of England in 1615

Iskandar Muda's reign was also marked by considerable brutality, directed at disobedient subjects. He also did not hesitate to execute wealthy subjects and confiscate their wealth. Punishments for offences were gruesome; a French visitor in the 1620s reported "every day the King would have people's noses cut off, eyes dug out, castrations, feet cut off, or hands, ears, and other parts mutilated, very often for some very small matter." He had his own son Crown Prince Meurah Pupok executed and named his son-in-law, the son of the captured Sultan of Pahang as his successor Iskandar Thani.

== Culture ==
During Iskandar Muda's reign, eminent Islamic scholars were attracted to Aceh and made it a centre of Islamic scholarship. Iskandar Muda favoured the tradition of the Sufi mystics Hamzah Pansuri and Syamsuddin of Pasai, both of whom resided at the court of Aceh. These writers' works were translated into other Indonesian languages, and had considerable influence across the peninsula. Both were later denounced for their heretical ideas by Nuruddin ar-Raniri, who arrived in the Aceh court during the reign of Iskandar Thani, and their books were ordered to be burnt.

The chronicle Hikayat Aceh ("The Story of Aceh") was probably written during the reign of Iskandar Muda, although some date it later. It describes the history of the sultanate and praises Iskandar Muda in his youth. It was apparently inspired by the Persian Akbarnama for the Mogul Emperor Akbar. The Hikayat Aceh described Iskandar Muda as a scion of the lineage (nasab) and race (bangsa) of Iskandar Zulkarnain, Alexander the Great. Through this statement, the hikayat presented Aceh as a part of the Malay world, since Iskandar Zulkarnain was the purported ancestor of the Melaka, Johor, Perak and Pahang rulers.

== Legacy ==
Among the Acehnese, Iskandar Muda is revered as a hero and symbol of Aceh's past greatness. Posthumously he was given the title Po Teuh Meureuhom, which means "Our Beloved Late Lord", or "Marhum Mahkota Alam".

He has several buildings and structures in and near Banda Aceh named after him, including the Sultan Iskandarmuda Airport and Sultan Iskandar Muda Air Force Base. Kodam Iskandar Muda is the name of the military area commands overseeing Aceh Province.

== Notes ==
Preceded by Ali Ri'ayat Syah III	Sultan of Aceh Sultanate; 4 April 1607 – 27 December 1636	Succeeded by Iskandar Thani
