= Battle of Jambi =

1630 naval battle

Battle of Jambi (1630)
- Part of Dutch–Portuguese War
Date	April 5th to May 5th, 1630
Location	Jambi river, Indonesia
Result	Portuguese victory

Belligerents
Kingdom of Portugal: (Portugal) Portuguese India	Dutch East India Company

Commanders and leaders
(Portugal) Nuno Álvares Botelho † (Portugal) Rui Freire de Andrade	Unknown

Strength
27 ships	28 ships

Casualties and losses
1 galliot sunk	7 ships burned or captured

The Battle of Jambi in 1630 was a naval engagement between Portuguese and Dutch ships in the Indonesian archipelago. Although the Portuguese won this battle, their commander Nuno Álvares Botelho, who is renowned in Portugal as one of the last great commanders of Portuguese India, drowned during the confrontation.

== Background ==
In 1629, Malacca was attacked by the Sultan of Aceh with around 19,000 men and 236 ships, but was completely annihilated by the Portuguese commander Nuno Álvares Botelho and his allies. This victory gave great prestige to him and to Portugal in general. He was received in Malacca with a euphoric triumph by captain António Fonseca and the city's population. The news of this great victory reached Goa in late February 1630 where it was also celebrated. The Viceroy of India Miguel de Noronha, commented, "I can affirm that all the victories that we read about in the chronicles of India cannot compare with this one." Thus, from a Portuguese viewpoint, the situation in the straits of Malacca had taken a positive turn.

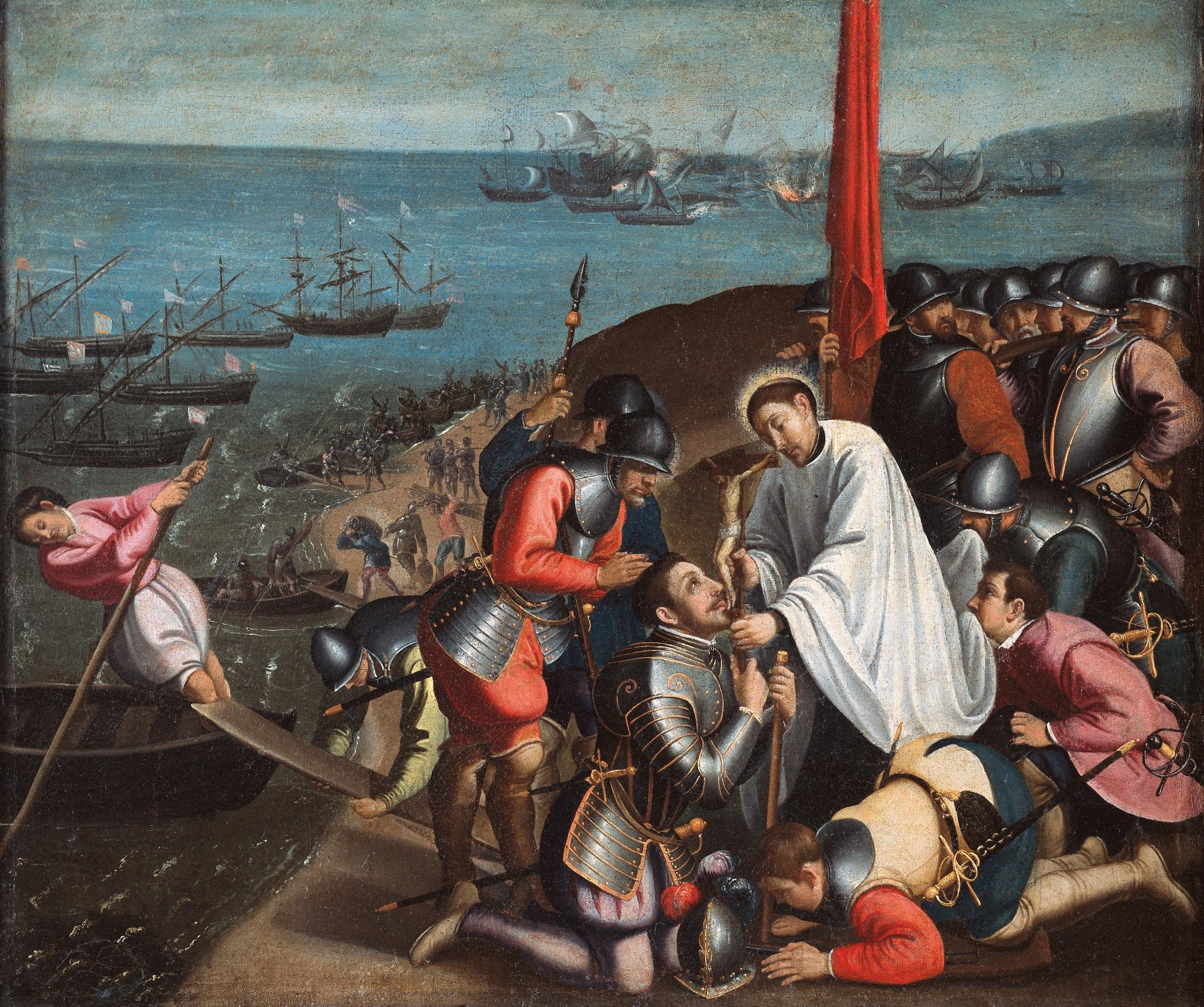
Portuguese soldiers at Malacca fighting the Acehnese, in a 1606 painting.

Shortly after that siege, Nuno Botelho decided to take the initiative. He met with Portuguese commercial shipping, which was coming from Macau, in order to protect it from the Dutch. After learning that the Count of Linhares had become the new Viceroy of India and had reached Goa in October 1629, Botelho gave him an account of everything he had done so far and asked for his assistance and approbation to continue his designs against the Dutch and English. The Viceroy not only sent Botelho everything he had asked but also gave him full power to act as a governor general, without having to wait for orders from Goa.

In the meantime, with 27 ships, Nuno Botelho sailed for Jambi, a place with a lot of pepper and much resorted by the Dutch and English. In any case, the Portuguese morale about taking the fight to the Dutch was very high, unlike several years prior.

== Battle ==
At the mouth of the Jambi river, Botelho found three Dutch ships, which he either captured or burned. Continuing upstream he found a large Dutch carrack, which he attacked immediately. This carrack blew up when a cannon-ball ignited its magazine. Then, even further up the river he successfully fired two more Dutch carracks full of pepper. Three weeks later, another Dutch carrack known as the Walcheren, arrived at the mouth of the river on May 5. Botelho promplty attacked this ship too, surrounding it from all sides. The Portuguese quickly boarded the carrack and the Dutch crew quickly fled below decks. The Portuguese then fired upon the ship and withdrew. However, one of their craft became entangled with the Walcheren's prow. Fearing that this ship would be caught by the fire, Nuno Botelho brought up his own jália (small galley-type ship) to assist it, but something exploded in the Dutch ship, which destroyed Botelho's jália. Unfortunaletly, he could not swim and after being thrown to the water, he drowned. According to Manuel Xavier, who wrote an account of these events, the heart of Botelho was still beating when he was rescued, but it was too late and he died soon after in the arms of his chaplain.

The Portuguese armada then withdrew to Malacca, carrying the body of their fallen commander.

== Aftermath ==
The first rumours of Botelho's death did not reach Goa until six months later, but the Portuguese Viceroy dismissed them as being lies made by the Dutch. When the unwelcomed report was confirmed in February 1631, Miguel de Noronha described it as "the worst news possible". A few days later he informed the King of Portugal, "I write this letter ... with tears in my eyes because I'm giving in it news to Your Majesty of the death in India ... of the man who with the cleanest heart and hands was serving your Majesty here." Indeed, Botelho's death was a heavy blow to Portuguese morale.

Nonetheless, the victories achieved by Nuno Álvares Botelho in Hormuz (1625), in Malacca (1629), in Jambi (1630) and his plans to attack Batavia, strongly impressed the Dutch. In their eyes, the Portuguese once again looked like respectable adversaries with whom it was necessary to be careful.
