= Iskandar Thani =

Sultan of Aceh

Sultan of Aceh Sultanate
- Reign: 27 December 1636 – 15 February 1641
- Predecessor: Iskandar Muda
- Successor: Taj ul-Alam Safiatuddin
- Born: 1610; Pahang, Johor Sultanate
- Died: 15 February 1641 (aged 30–31); Banda Aceh, Aceh Sultanate
- Spouse: Taj ul-Alam Safiatuddin
- House: Pahang
- Father: Ahmad Shah II of Pahang
- Mother: Putri Bongsu Chandra Dewi
- Religion: Islam

Iskandar Thani Alauddin Mughayat Syah (1610 – 15 February 1641) was the thirteenth sultan of Aceh, following the powerful Iskandar Muda. Iskandar Thani was the son of the 11th sultan of Pahang, Ahmad Shah II, who was brought to Aceh in the conquest of Pahang in 1617 by Iskandar Muda. He married the sultan's daughter, the later Sulṭāna Taj ul-Alam, and succeeded Iskandar Muda as sultan when he died in 1636.

Reigning in the wake of the rout of the Acehnese fleet in 1629, Iskandar Thani was not able to continue his predecessor's military successes. He was a strong ruler, able to suppress the orang kaya (Acehnese nobility) and working to centralize royal power as Iskandar Muda had done. His rule was too short to make major accomplishments, however, and after his death the elite re-asserted their influence, and placed his widow, Taj ul-Alam, on the throne, the first of several weak sultans.

Like Iskandar Muda's, the court of Iskandar Thani was known as a center of Islamic learning. He was the patron of Nuruddin ar-Raniri, an Islamic scholar from Gujarat who arrived in Aceh in 1637. Ar-Raniri denounced the work of earlier scholars from Iskandar Muda's court, and ordered their books to be burned while establishing literary and religious standards.

== See also ==
- Acehnese-Portuguese conflicts

== Notes ==
Preceded by Iskandar Muda	Sultan of Aceh Sultanate; 27 December 1636 – 15 February 1641	Succeeded by Taj ul-Alam
