= Sultan Muda =

Sultan of Aceh Sultanate
- Reign: 1579
- Predecessor: Ali Ri'ayat Syah I
- Successor: Sri Alam

Raja Pariaman (vassal)
- Reign: ?-1579
- Predecessor: ?
- Successor: Sri Alam
- Born: Banda Aceh, Aceh Sultanate
- Died: 1579; Banda Aceh, Aceh Sultanate
- House: Meukuta Alam
- Father: Ali Ri'ayat Syah I

Sultan Muda (b. and d. 1579; literally "young sultan") was a nominal sultan of Aceh in northern Sumatra. His brief tenure started a decade-long period of dynastic weakness and strife in the Aceh kingdom.

Sultan Muda was the only known child of the previous ruler, Sultan Ali Ri'ayat Syah I. When Sultan Ali died in June 1579, he was nominally succeeded by Sultan Muda who was only four months old. However, the child died after a very short time. He was succeeded by his uncle Sultan Mughal who was the vassal lord of Priaman. The new ruler took the throne name Sultan Sri Alam.

== Literature ==
- Djajadiningrat, Raden Hoesein (1911) 'Critisch overzicht van de in Maleische werken vervatte gegevens over de geschiedenis van het soeltanaat van Atjeh', Bijdragen tot de Taal-, Land- en Volkenkunde, 65, pp. 135-265.
- Encyclopaedia van Nederlandsch-Indië (1917) Vol. 1 ('s Gravenhage & Leiden: M. Nijhoff & Brill).

Preceded by Ali Ri'ayat Syah I	Sultan of Aceh Sultanate; 1579	Succeeded by Sri Alam
