= Alauddin al-Kahar =

Sultan of Aceh (1537/9–1571)

Alauddin Ri'ayat Syah al-Qahhar علاء الدين رعاية شاه القهار
- Sultan
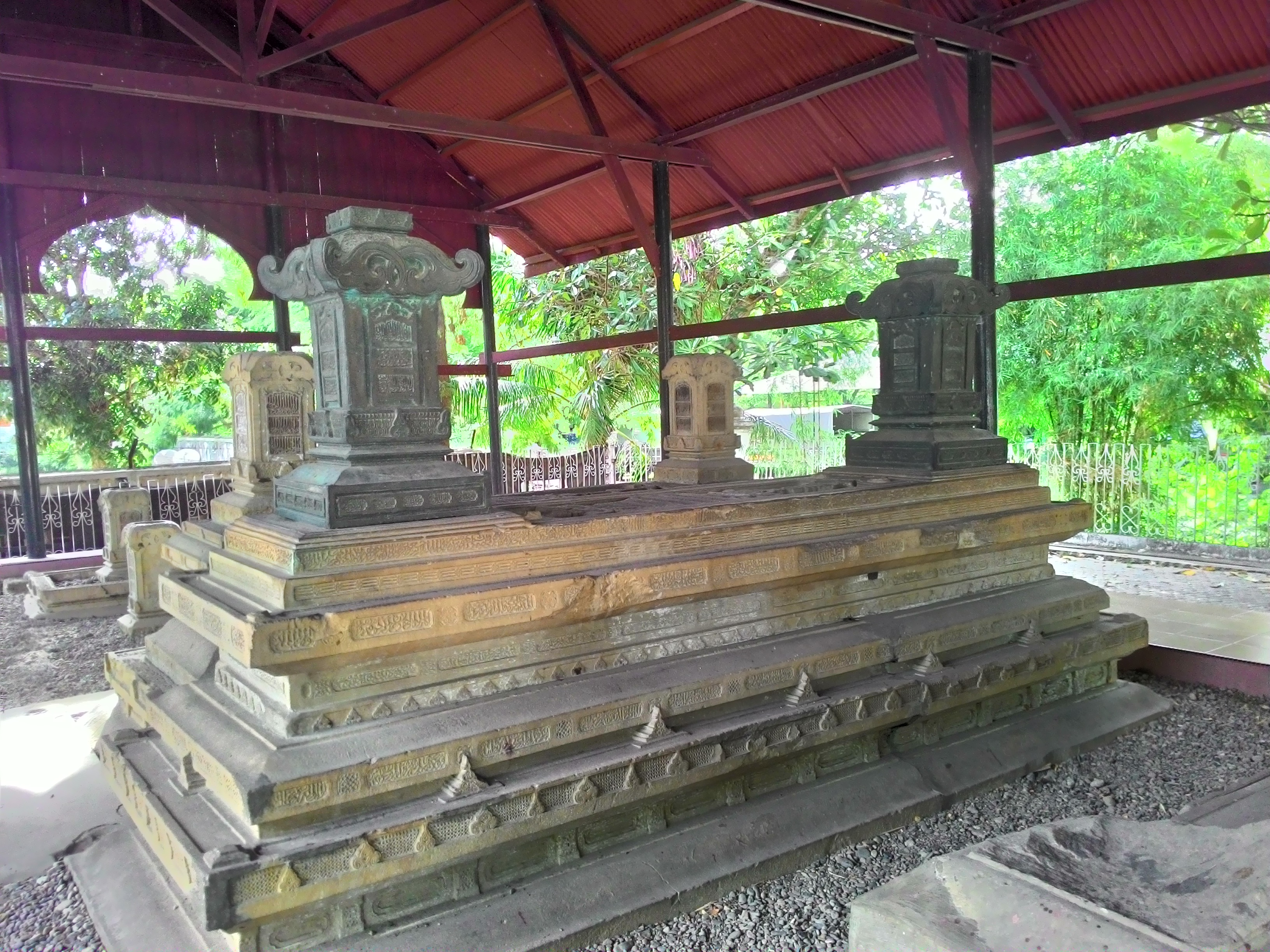
- Grave of al-Kahar in Baitur Rijal (Kandang XII), Banda Aceh

Sultan of Aceh Sultanate
- Reign: 1537/1539 – 28 September 1571
- Predecessor: Salahuddin of Aceh
- Successor: Ali Ri'ayat Syah I
- Born: Banda Aceh, Aceh Sultanate
- Died: 28 September 1571; Banda Aceh, Aceh Sultanate
- Burial: Cemetery Complex of the Sultans of Aceh Kandang XII, Banda Aceh
- Issue: Abdullah; Husain; Sri Alam; Abdul Jalil
- House: Meukuta Alam
- Father: Ali Mughayat Syah
- Mother: unnamed daughter of Inayat Syah

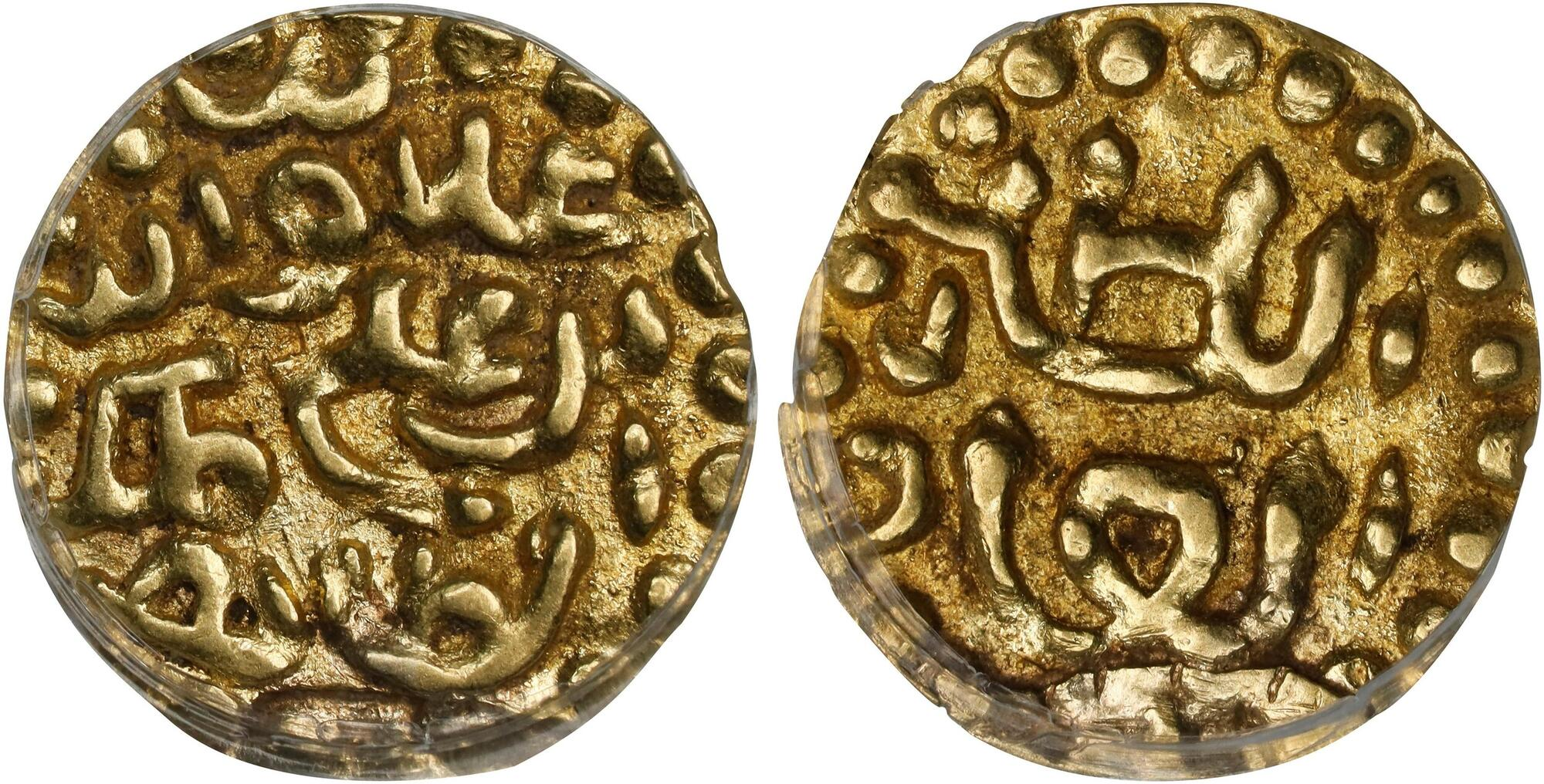
Aceh coin from the era of Sultan Alauddin Ri'ayat Syah al-Qahhar.

Alauddin Ri'ayat Syah al-Kahar (died 29 September 1571) was the third Sultan of the Aceh Sultanate, reigning from either 1537 or 1539 until his death. He is considered to be one of the strongest rulers in the history of the sultanate and greatly strengthened Aceh. Alauddin's reign was marked by increased conflict with the Portuguese and their Malay and Sumatran allies and his dispatching of envoys to the Ottoman sultan, Suleiman the Magnificent in the 1560s.

== Taking power ==
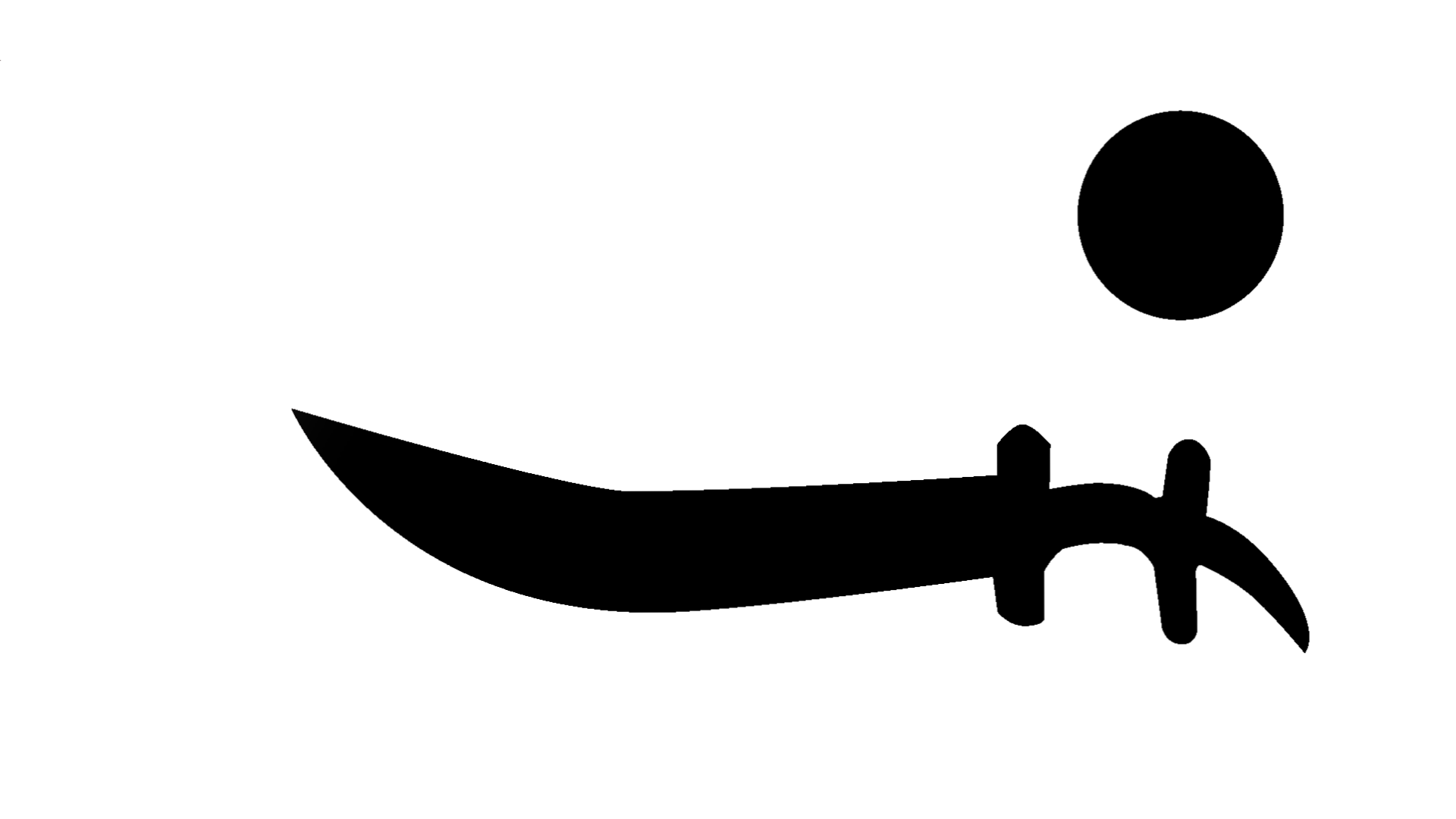
The original flag of Aceh Sultanate. (before it became an "Ottoman protectorate")

Alauddin was the second son of Sultan Ali Mughayat Syah, founder of the Aceh Sultanate.

After Ali's death in 1530, his eldest son Salahuddin ruled for a while but was inept in governing the sultanate. The queen mother had great influence in the state and appointed a regent called Raja Bungsu who had a green payung (parasol), a symbol of authority, and a house opposite the royal abode. Meanwhile, Alauddin governed Samudra Pasai which had been conquered by Aceh in 1524. Being dissatisfied with conditions in the capital, he staged a royal coup in c. 1537 or 1539, killed Raja Bungsu, and imprisoned Salahuddin and the Queen Mother Sitt Hur, who would die years later in 1548 and 1554 respectively. Alauddin now took the throne with the regnal title Sultan Alauddin Ri'ayat Syah al-Kahar. Under Acehnese tradition he is remembered as a great organizer of the Acehnese state. Thus he was supposedly the ruler who divided Acehnese society into administrative lineage groups (kaum or sukeë), but it is unclear whether this attribution is correct.

== Conquests on Sumatra ==
The campaigns of Alauddin began in 1539 when he waged war on the Batak people, who lived to the south of Aceh. The Portuguese traveler Fernão Mendes Pinto mentions that the sultan asked the king of the Bataks to convert to Islam, and attacked him when he refused. Pinto provides a long and picturesque account of the Bataks and their affairs with the Acehnese; it is doubtful from the point of view that no comprehensive Batak kingdom is known to other sources. The Acehnese army reportedly included contingents of Turks and men from Cambay and Malabar. After this campaign Alauddin attacked the Aru Kingdom, (the later Deli Sultanate). He killed the ruler of Aru in 1539, but was then forced by the Johor Sultanate's army to withdraw in around 1540, Aru subsequently belonged to Johor up to 1564.

== Enterprises against Melaka and Johor ==
The principal enemy was, however, Melaka, which was held by the Portuguese since 1511. There were both economic, political and religious reasons for the intense rivalry. At stake was the control of the trade through the Melaka Straits. In 1547, Alauddin personally participated in a night attack on Melaka. However, the Acehnese fleet was defeated at the Perlis River. After the failure, Aceh returned to a comparatively peaceful state for 15 years. However, in 1564 he led a fleet of ships, ostensibly to go to Patani. Suddenly, he ordered the course changed and instead assaulted Johor, the successor state of the old Melaka Sultanate. The enterprise was successful; Johor was sacked and Alauddin brought its sultan, Alauddin Riayat Shah II of Johor, to Aceh where he died because of sickness. A Johor princess was married to the sultan. Instead of the deposed ruler, Muzaffar II was placed on the throne of Johor. With the defeat of Johor, Aru fell to Aceh and was entrusted to Alauddin's son Abdullah. In January 1568 the sultan undertook another attack on Malacca. He personally led 15,000 troops and 400 Ottoman elite soldiers, using 200 bronze cannons. The Portuguese, surprised by the assault, applied for help from the Malay neighbours of Johor and Kedah. They were nevertheless able to beat back the Acehnese before the Malay allies had even arrived. At this occasion, Alauddin's oldest son Abdullah of Aru was killed. The attitude of Johor enraged the sultan who burned many Johorese villages on his way back to Aceh. When Muzaffar of Johor was poisoned, Alauddin sent another fleet to Johor, but had to return due to the strength of Johor's defenses.

== Ottoman relations ==
In order to strengthen his case, Alauddin dispatched envoys to the Ottoman sultan, Suleiman the Magnificent, around 1561–1562, asking for assistance against the infidel Portuguese. At this time the predatory practices of Portuguese ships made the sea route over the Indian Ocean dangerous for Muslim ships. An alternative route for pepper trade therefore developed from about 1530, where Gujarati, Arab, Turkish and Acehnese traders brought spices directly from Aceh to the Red Sea without coming near Portuguese strongholds in the Melaka Straits. The Ottomans and Aceh thus had common interests to counter the Portuguese might on the oceans. Turkish gunners were sent to Aceh by 1564. The next Ottoman sultan, Selim II, showed enthusiasm for supporting the Acehnese. He equipped a fleet of 15 galleys and two barques. However, before it could be dispatched, al-Mutahhar's rebellion broke out in Yemen and the fleet had to be recalled there. Nevertheless, two vessels with munitions and military experts reached Aceh and the crew appeared to have stayed in Alauddin's service. They participated in the 1568 campaign, while in a new sea battle with the Portuguese in 1570, the Acehnese likewise made use of Turkish arms. This campaign was apparently coordinated with the attack on Portuguese Goa by the Deccan Sultanates of Bijapur, Golconda, Bidar and Ahmadnagar. The battle, which took place close to the main port of Aceh, was nevertheless a failure, and the Acehnese fleet suffered great losses. The superior artillery and more robust ships of the Portuguese explain part of the repeated Acehnese failures, which Turkish help could not make up for.

== Family and death ==
According to the relatively trustworthy chronicle Bustanus Salatin, Alauddin had five sons:

- Sultan Abdullah, ruler of Aru (d. 1568)
- Sultan Husain, later Sultan Ali Ri'ayat Syah I (d. 1579)
- Sultan Mughal, ruler of Priaman, later Sultan Sri Alam (d. 1579)
- Abdul Jalil, killed by his father due to excessive ambition; grandfather of Sultan Iskandar Muda

Sultan Alauddin Ri'ayat Syah al-Kahar died on 28 September 1571, as is apparent from the inscription on his grave. He was succeeded by his son Sultan Ali Ri'ayat Syah I. Although Sultan Alauddin was not actually militarily successful against Portuguese Melaka, his reign witnessed the beginning of the high tide of Aceh's power.

== See also ==
- Ottoman expedition to Aceh
- Spread of Islam in Indonesia

== Sources ==
- Djajadiningrat, Raden Hoesein (1911) 'Critisch overzicht van de in Maleische werken vervatte gegevens over de geschiedenis van het soeltanaat van Atjeh', Bijdragen tot de Taal-, Land- en Volkenkunde, 65, pp. 135–265.
- Encyclopedia of Islam (1960), Vol. 1. Leiden & London: Brill & Luzac.
- Hadi, Amirul (2004) Islam and State in Sumatra: A Study of Seventeenth-Century Aceh. Leiden: Brill.
- Iskandar, Teuku (1958) De Hikajat Atjeh. 's Gravenhage: M. Nijhoff.
- Kalus, Ludvik & Claude Guillot (2013) 'La principauté de Daya, mi-XVe-mi-XVIe siècle', Archipel 85, pp. 201–36.
- Lombard, Denys (1967) Le sultanat d'Atjéh au temps d'Iskandar Muda, 1607-1636. Paris: École française d'Extrême-Orient.
- Reid, Anthony (2010) 'Aceh and the Turkish Connection', in Arndt Graaf et al. (eds), Aceh: History, Politics and Culture. Singapore: ISEAS, pp. 26–38.
- Ricklefs, Merle C. (1994) A History of Modern Indonesia Since c. 1300, Stanford: Stanford University Press.

Preceded by Salahuddin	Sultan of Aceh Sultanate c. 1537/39–1571	Succeeded by Ali Ri'ayat Syah I
