= Ali Ri'ayat Syah I =

Sultan of Aceh (1571–1579)

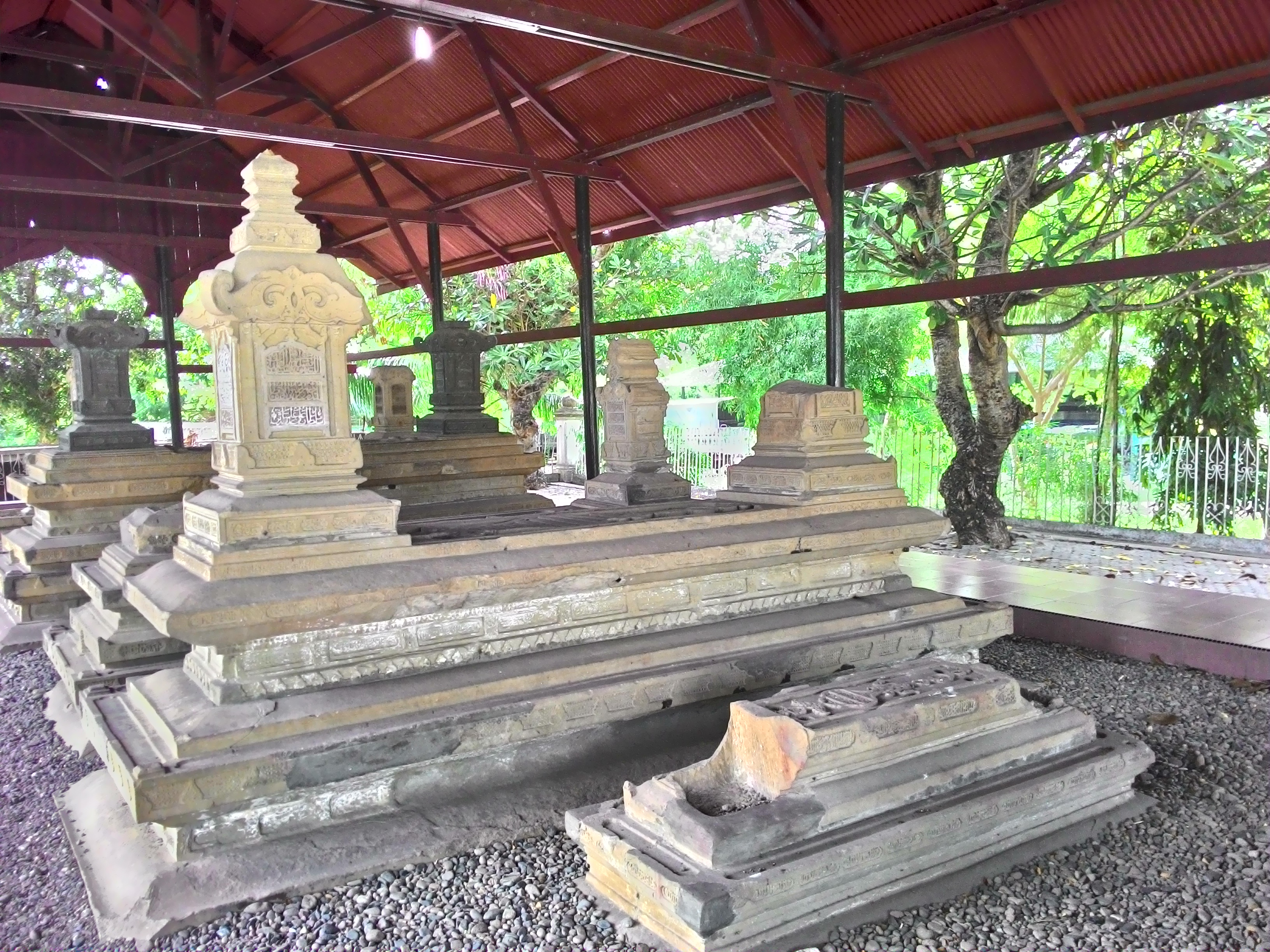
- Grave of Sultan Ali Ri'ayat Syah I

Sultan of Aceh Sultanate
- Reign: 28 September 1571 – 8 June 1579
- Predecessor: Salahuddin of Aceh
- Successor: Sultan Muda
- Born: Banda Aceh, Aceh Sultanate
- Died: 8 June 1579; Banda Aceh, Aceh Sultanate
- Issue: Sultan Muda
- House: Meukuta Alam
- Father: Alauddin al-Kahar

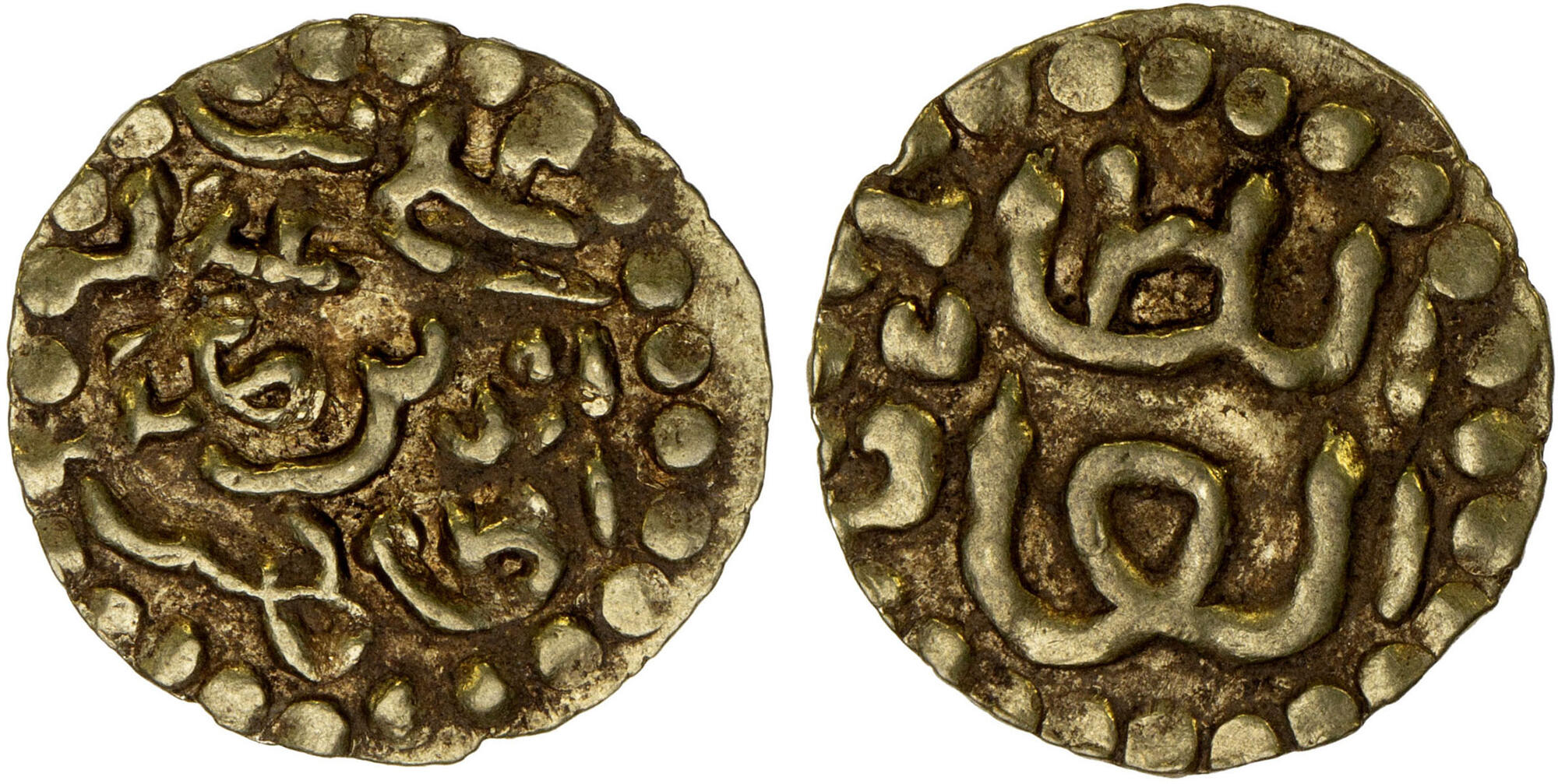
Coin of Aceh from the era of Sultan Husein Ali Ri'ayat Syah I.

Sultan Husein Ali Ri'ayat Syah I, also known as Sultan Husein (d. 8 June 1579), was the fourth sultan of Aceh in northern Sumatra. He reigned from 1571 to 1579 and continued his father's policy of fighting the Portuguese in Melaka.

== Succession and dynastic rivalry ==
Sultan Husein, the later Sultan Ali, was the second son of Sultan Alauddin al-Kahar. His elder brother Abdullah fell against the Portuguese in the siege of Melaka in January 1568. This left Sultan Husein the heir to the kingdom. When Alauddin al-Kahar died on 28 September 1571, he succeeded to the throne under the name Sultan Ali Ri'ayat Syah. According to the chronicle Bustanus Salatin, he was of a mild disposition and friendly towards scholars and other subjects. During his reign an Arab scholar called Shaykh Nur ad-Din arrived from Mecca. He belonged to the Shafi'i school of law and taught metaphysics in Aceh until his death. This may be seen against the important commercial and political relations with the Ottoman Empire at the time.

Another chronicle, Hikayat Aceh, tells of dissent within the royal family. His envious brothers Sultan Mughal and Sultan Ghori plotted to depose him. Sultan Mughal visited Fansur (Barus) and got help from two Batak sorcerers. He then proceeded to the capital Kutaraja (Banda Aceh) and was friendly received by Sultan Ali. Some time later he let the two Bataks enter the palace compound and perform black magic, with the result that the sultan fell ill. The other brother Sultan Ghori arrived to Kutaraja but was refused entrance. Now Sultan Mughal made preparations to smuggle his accomplices into the part of the palace where he stayed in order to perform the coup. This came to the ears of Sultan Ali, who in turn resorted to strategy: he brought in atap (leaves to cover houses) where weapons were hidden. Sultan Mughal was attacked and killed in the tumult in spite of orders by the sultan to spare him. Sultan Ali gave orders to kill all the men of Sultan Mughal but withdrew the order at second thought.

== War with the Portuguese ==
Sultan Ali continued his father's policy of unbending hostility towards the Christian Portuguese, who were ensconced in Melaka since 1511. The period around 1560–1580 was the highest point for the military enterprise of Islam in the East Indies. Through its considerable naval power Aceh contested the Melaka Straits with the support from the Malay sultanate Johor and the Javanese emporium Japara. However, the military capabilities of the Acehnese were not sufficient to expel the Portuguese. A first attempt on Melaka was made in 1573, but in spite of the formidable armada and Turkish assistance the attempt failed. A new expedition got under way in February 1575, supported by Johor and Bintan. The attack was moderately successful to the extent that a few Portuguese ships were destroyed. However, after a 17 days long siege the armada suddenly withdrew from the walls of Melaka. A last attempt in 1577 was likewise a failure; this time the Achnese suffered great losses and the enterprise was called off. In spite of their considerable resources, the Acehnese suffered from inferior artillery, less robust ships, and inferior military tactics compared to their European enemy. More success was scored on the Malay Peninsula where the tin-producing kingdom Perak was attacked and defeated in 1573. Since Perak was an ally of Johor, the event signaled worsened relations with that state.

Sultan Ali Ri'ayat Syah died on 8 June 1579. He left a new-born son called Sultan Muda who was formally enthroned. With this, a decade-long period of dynastic instability and weakness began in Aceh.

== Literature ==
- Djajadiningrat, Raden Hoesein (1911) 'Critisch overzicht van de in Maleische werken vervatte gegevens over de geschiedenis van het soeltanaat van Atjeh', Bijdragen tot de Taal-, Land- en Volkenkunde, 65, pp. 135–265.
- Hadi, Amirul (2004) Islam and State in Sumatra: A Study of Seventeenth-Century Aceh. Leiden: Brill.
- Iskandar, Teuku (1958) De Hikajat Atjeh. 's Gravenhage: M. Nijhoff.
- Reid, Anthony (2010) 'Aceh and the Turkish Connection', in Arndt Graaf et al. (eds), Aceh: History, Politics and Culture. Singapore: ISEAS, pp. 26–38.

Preceded by Alauddin al-Kahar	Banda Aceh, Aceh Sultanate; 28 September 1571 – 8 June 1579	Succeeded by Sultan Muda
