= Ali Mughayat Syah =

Sultan of Aceh (c. 1514–1530)

Ali Mughayat Shah علي محياة شاه
- Sultan
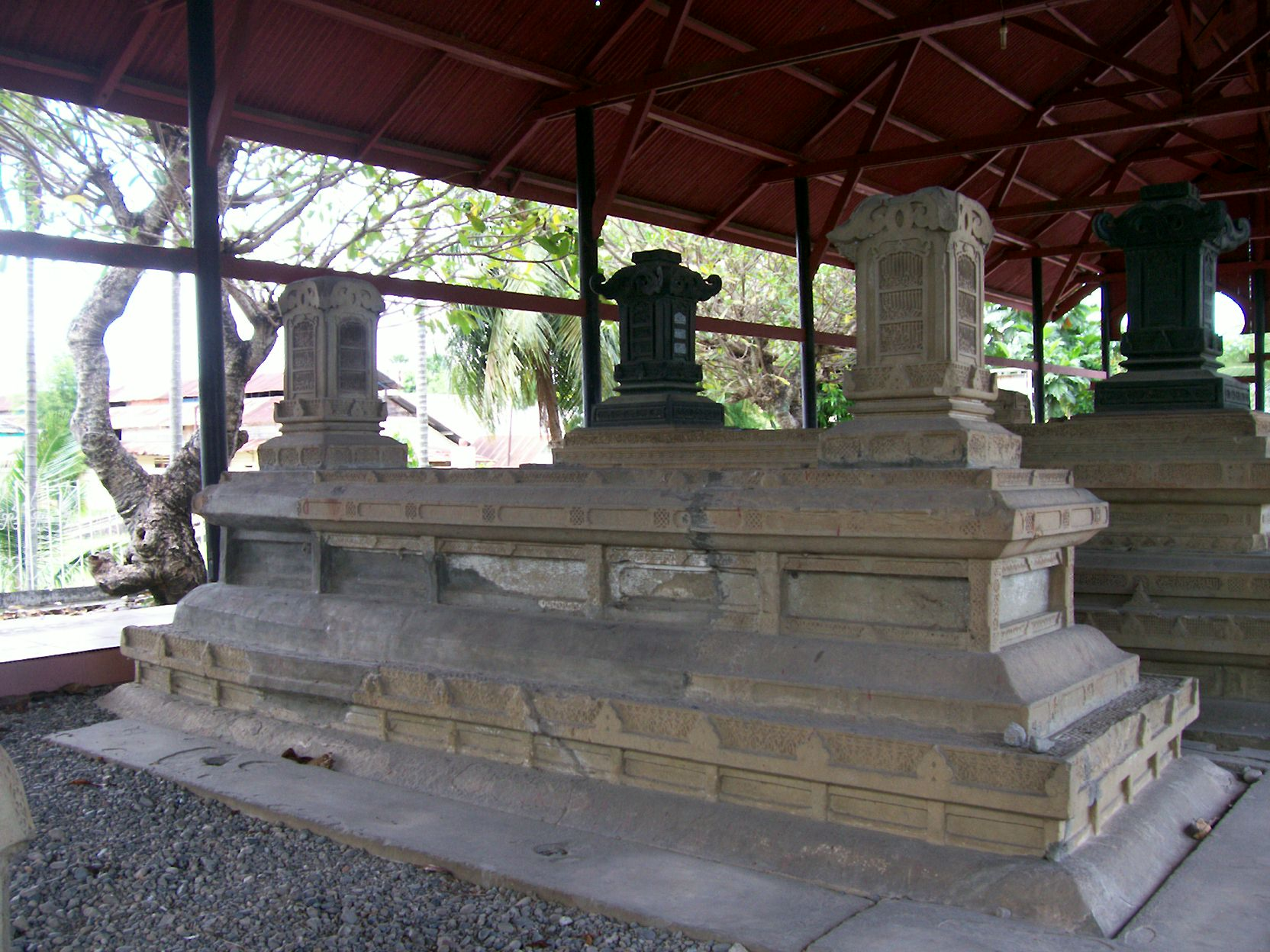
- The Tomb of Sultan Ali Mughayat Shah in the Kandang XII Complex, Banda Aceh

Sultan of Aceh Sultanate
- Reign: c. 1514 – 7 August 1530
- Coronation: 1496
- Predecessor: Sultanate established
- Successor: Salahuddin

Sultan of Meukuta Alam Dynasty
- Reign: January 1495 – Agustus 1530
- Predecessor: Sultan Shams Shah
- Successor: Sultans of Aceh
- Born: Banda Aceh, Aceh Sultanate
- Died: 6 August 1530; Banda Aceh
- Burial: Cemetery Complex of the Sultans of Aceh Kandang XII, Banda Aceh
- House: Meukuta Alam
- Father: Shams Shah
- Mother: unnamed daughter of Inayat Syah
- Religion: Islam

Ali Mughayat Syah (died 7 August 1530) was the founder and first Sultan of Aceh Darussalam in Northern Sumatra, reigning from about 1514 until his death. His reign not only saw the foundation of the Aceh Sultanate, but also the conquest of neighboring Daya (1520), Pidie (1521), and Pasai (1524). Despite his accomplishments, Ali Mughayat's life is poorly documented and must be pieced together from various Acehnese, Malay and European accounts.

== Rise of Aceh ==
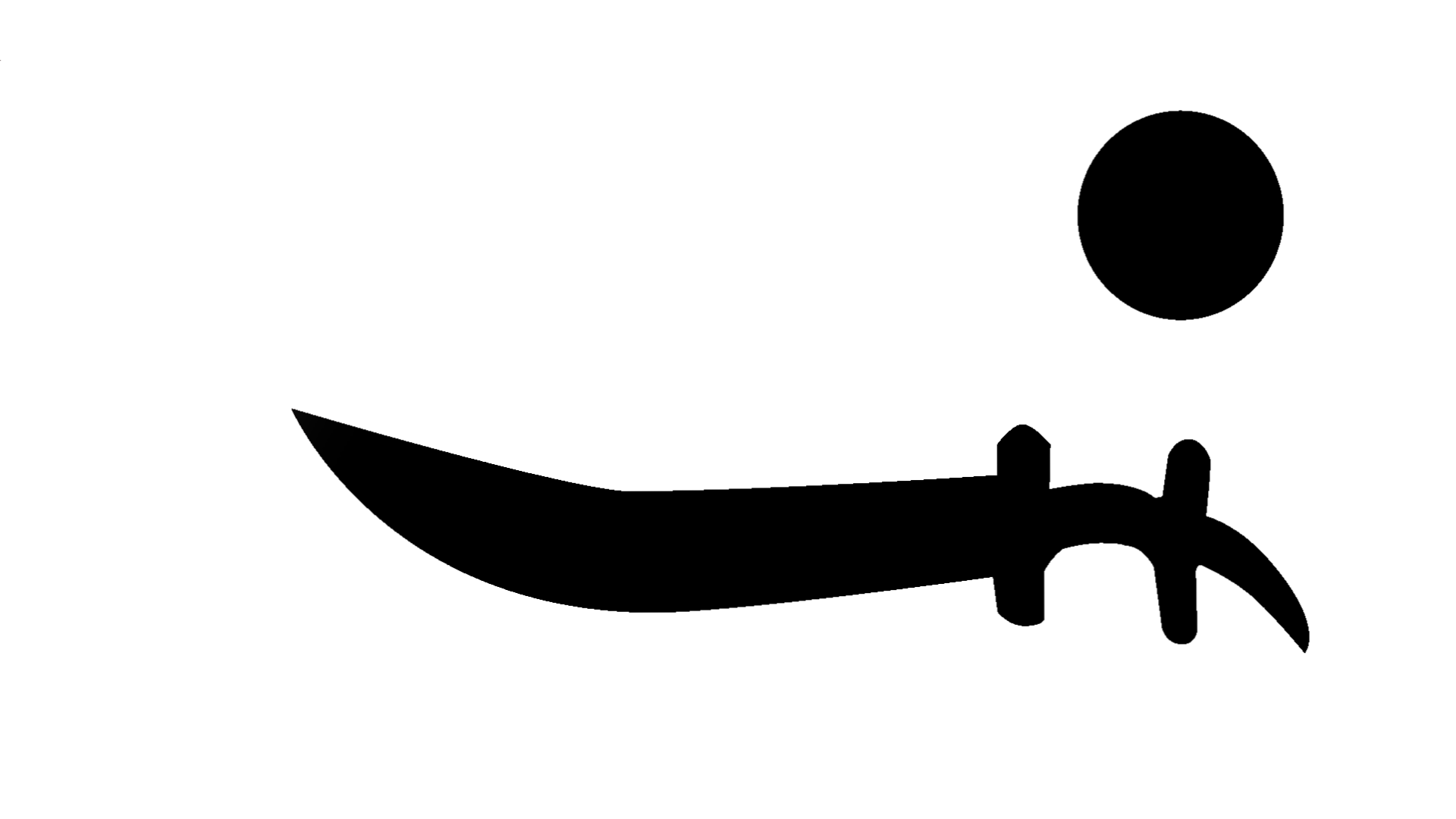
The original flag of Aceh Sultanate. (before it became an "Ottoman protectorate")

In the 15th century, three port kingdoms dominated northernmost Sumatra. Samudra Pasai had been a Muslim sultanate since the late 13th century, controlling part of the inter-Asian trade that went through the Melaka Straits. However, by the early 16th century it was wrecked by political turmoil. Another important state was Pidie (located on the present Pedie Regency) which was a prominent producer of pepper and befriended the Portuguese since 1509. A third one was Daya (possibly at present-day Calang) where the Portuguese founded a settlement in the early 16th century.

The origins of Aceh are disputed. According to the Hikayat Aceh two bidadaris (heavenly nymphs) married two princely brothers from Lamuri and gave rise to the royal dynasty. Other stories speak of Minangkabau, Arab or even Seljuq origins for the royal line. According to the Sejarah Melayu a prince of Champa called Syah Poling (Pau Ling), the son of the King of Champa Syah Pau Kubah, fled Champa when the Le dynasty sacked the capital, Vijaya in 1471. He founded the royal line in Aceh. Indeed, Acehnese is the only non-Chamic relative in the subgroup Aceh-Chamic languages.

While the exact origins of the Aceh Sultanate are still disputed, it likely first emerged from the unification of two kingdoms in Northern Sumatra: Aceh in Dar al-Kamal and Lamuri in Mahkota Alam. At the end of the 15th century, Inayat Syah, son of Abdullah Almalik Almubin, reigned over Aceh in Dar al-Kamal, the direct predecessor of Banda Aceh. He had two sons, namely Alauddin (d. 1508) who was king of Daya, and Sultan Muzaffar Syah who succeeded his father. Muzaffar was probably expelled by the king of Pidie and died in 1497. When the Portuguese arrived some years later they heard that Aceh was a vassal under Pidie. At this time it was governed by Syamsu Syah, son of Munawwar Syah. Syamsu Syah later had to abdicate in favour of his son Ali Mughayat Syah, and died in 1530. Ali was married to Sitt Hur (d. 1554), a daughter of Alauddin of Daya (alternatively, with Puteri Setia Indera, daughter of Raja Inayat Syah), thus binding the two lines of the Aceh rulers together. He was strongly supported by his brother Raja Ibrahim, who was a prominent military commander. According to the authoritative chronicle Bustanus Salatin, he was the first sultan of Aceh.

== Conquest of Pidie ==
The time when Sultan Ali Mughayat Syah came to the throne is not certain. The later chronicles give him 15, 16 or 18 years which would place his accession at c. 1512–1515. He may have reigned earlier than that since his reign reportedly overlapped with that of Sultan Ma'arif Syah of Pidie (d. 1511). According to the Hikayat Aceh, Sultan Maa'rif asked for Sultan Ali's sister in marriage but was turned down since he ate with commoners, and since Sultan Ali's family was descended from a bidadari. The enraged Ma'arif attacked Aceh but suffered defeat due to Sultan Ali's superior tactics, this marked an end to Aceh's dependence on Pidie. At his death, dated in 1511 by epigraphic evidence, Sultan Ma'arif was succeeded by his son Sultan Ahmad, but he was not valued by the population since he had not done his best in the struggle against Aceh. A Portuguese source from c. 1512–1515 suggests that the war between Aceh and Pidie was raging at that time. After a while Sultan Ali invaded Pidie, whose ruler was abandoned by his people and he was only defended by his slaves. Sultan Ahmad fled to Pasai while Pidie was incorporated into the Aceh kingdom. Portuguese sources indicate that this happened in the early 1520s.

== Conflict with Portuguese Melaka ==
Meanwhile, the Portuguese had conquered Melaka in 1511. They rapidly gained the animosity of Muslim and other traders who preferred to move to other port cities in the region. In this process, the strongly Muslim Aceh was a clear winner. Aceh enjoyed a strategic location at the northern tip of Sumatra, which gave it access to trade in the Indian Ocean area and the Red Sea. An unreliable Ottoman account says that the sultan of Aceh approached the Ottoman sultan Selim I in 1516 and offered vassalage. However, Acehnese-Ottoman relations seem to belong to a later period, during the reign of Sultan Ali's son Alauddin al-Kahar. In his geographical work Suma Oriental (c. 1512–1515) the Portuguese writer Tomé Pires writes that the king of Aceh also ruled over Lamuri and lorded over Biheue. He was "a knightly man among his neighbours. He uses piracy when he sees an opportunity." The ruler had 40 lancharas (ships) to use for sea expeditions. Other kingdoms on the north coast at that time included Pidie, Lide (unknown location), Peudada, and Pasai.

The first direct contact between Aceh and the Portuguese took place in 1519 when Gaspar da Costa arrived by ship but was captured by the inhabitants. He was later ransomed by the syahbandar (harbour master) of Pasai and found refuge there. The next year, Sultan Ali and his brother Raja Ibrahim began a series of military campaigns to dominate the northern part of Sumatra, which would soon draw in the Portuguese in a deadly struggle. His first campaign was to Daya, on the northwest coast, which, according to Tomé Pires, had not yet been Islamized (although this can only be partly true since members of the Acehnese sultan's family ruled the place). A Portuguese fort had been built there, but was now lost. Further conquests extended down the east coast, incorporating several pepper-producing and gold-producing regions. The addition of such regions ultimately led to internal tensions within the sultanate, as Aceh's strength was as a trading port, whose economic interests vary from those of ports producing minerals and pepper.

Later, a Portuguese fleet of 200 men led by Jorge de Brito arrived in 1521. Sultan Ali sent an envoy, a certain Portuguese who stayed in Aceh, with gifts to the visitors. However, the envoy changed sides and persuaded de Brito to attack the capital of Aceh, reminding him of previous Acehnese robberies and enticing him with stories of a sanctuary filled with gold in the capital. However, Sultan Ali marched out with 800–1,000 men along with six elephants and inflicted a total defeat on the Portuguese. De Brito was killed and the survivors fled back on their ships. Much European artillery was captured which came to good use against Pidie. In the same year the Portuguese occupied Pasai, inspiring new Acehnese attacks.

== Final victories and death ==
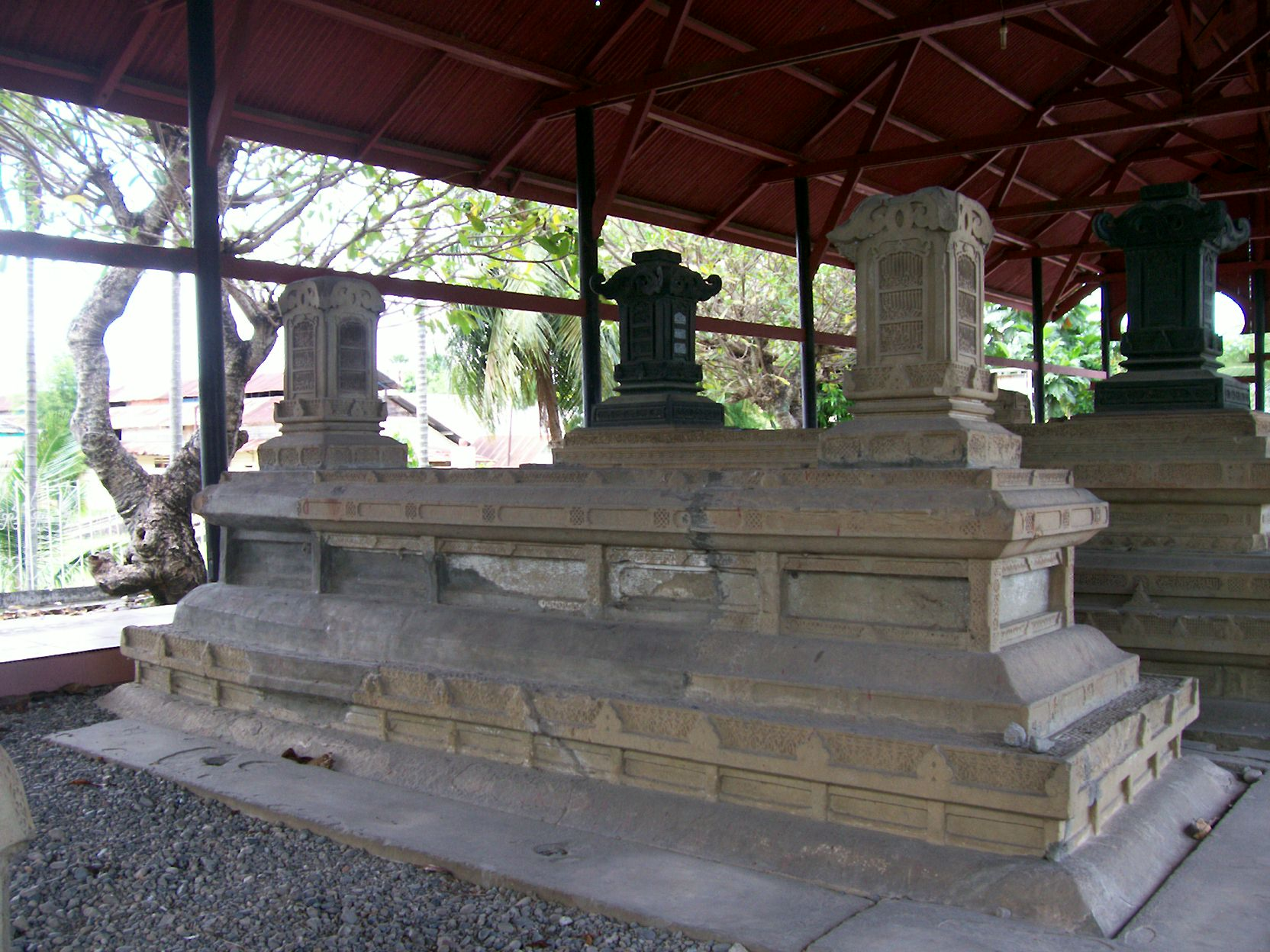
Ali Mughayat Syah's tomb in Banda Aceh

Soon after Pidie was conquered, a Portuguese fleet which had been dispatched to support Pidie was successfully pushed back. Sultan Ali's brother and commander Raja Ibrahim died during the war of conquest on 30 November 1523. However, in 1524 Pasai was eventually captured and the Portuguese garrison there was expelled. The Sultan of Pasai fled to Melaka while the former rulers of Pidie and Daya escaped to Aru (roughly corresponding to the later Deli Sultanate).

These military actions challenged both the naval power of the Portuguese and the holdings of the Sultanate of Johor on Sumatra. The victories of the 1520s created the larger Aceh Sultanate that would exist until the Aceh War (1873–1903). However, the struggle with the Portuguese went on unabated. In 1527, Captain Francisco de Mello sank an Acehnese vessel at the roadstead outside the capital and killed its crew. In the next year, Simão de Sousa Galvão was forced to seek shelter in Aceh due to a storm. He was attacked by the local people who killed most of the foreigners and took the rest as prisoners. Sultan Ali began to negotiate peace, with the outcome being that preparations for a joint expedition by Aru and the Portuguese were halted. Nevertheless, new incidents soon followed and the sultan had all the Portuguese prisoners killed. In 1529, Sultan Ali planned to conquer Melaka by surprise; however, news of the plans leaked out and the enterprise never got under way.

The death of Sultan Ali Mughayat Syah is given variously by the later chronicles: 1511, 1522, 1530. According to the testimony of his gravestone he died on 7 August 1530, exactly one month before his abdicated father Syamsu, and was buried in the palace compound of Kutaraja (Banda Aceh). According to the Portuguese chronicler João de Barros he was poisoned by his wife, a sister of the ruler of Daya, in order to exact revenge for the conquest of Daya. This lady, Sitt Hur, survived him for 24 years and died on 6 December 1554. Sultan Ali left two sons called Salahuddin and Alauddin al-Kahar. Salahuddin, who did not share his military capabilities, nevertheless succeeded him on the throne. However, it was the younger son Alauddin who would lay the real basis for Aceh's power after the 1530s.

== See also ==
- Acehnese–Portuguese conflicts
- Spread of Islam in Indonesia

== Sources ==
- Djajadiningrat, Raden Hoesein (1911) 'Critisch overzicht van de in Maleische werken vervatte gegevens over de geschiedenis van het soeltanaat van Atjeh', Bijdragen tot de Taal-, Land- en Volkenkunde 65, pp. 135–265.
- Encyclopaedie van Nederlandsch Indië, Vol. 1 (1917). 's Gravenhage & Leiden: Nijhoff & Brill.
- Hadi, Amirul (2004) Islam and State in Sumatra: A Study of Seventeenth-Century Aceh. Leiden: Brill.
- Iskandar, Teuku (1958) De Hikajat Atjeh. 's Gravenhage: M. Nijhoff.
- Kalus, Ludvik & Claude Guillot (2013) 'La principauté de Daya, mi-XVe–mi-XVIe siècle', Archipel 85, pp. 201–36.
- Pires, Tomé (1944) The Suma Oriental, Vols. 1–2. London: The Hakluyt Society.
- Ricklefs, Merle C. (1994) A History of Modern Indonesia Since c. 1300. Stanford: Stanford University Press.

Preceded by Sultanate Established	Sultan of Aceh Sultanate c. 1514–1530	Succeeded by Salahuddin
