= Portuguese Malacca =

Portuguese possession in Southeast Asia (1511–1641)

Coordinates: 2°11′20″N 102°23′4″E

Portuguese Malacca Malaca Portuguesa (Portuguese) Melaka Portugis (Malay)
- 1511–1641
- Flag Coat of arms

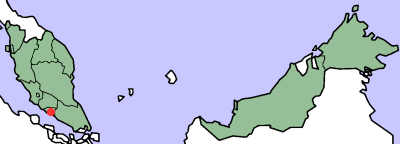
- Malacca, shown within modern Malaysia

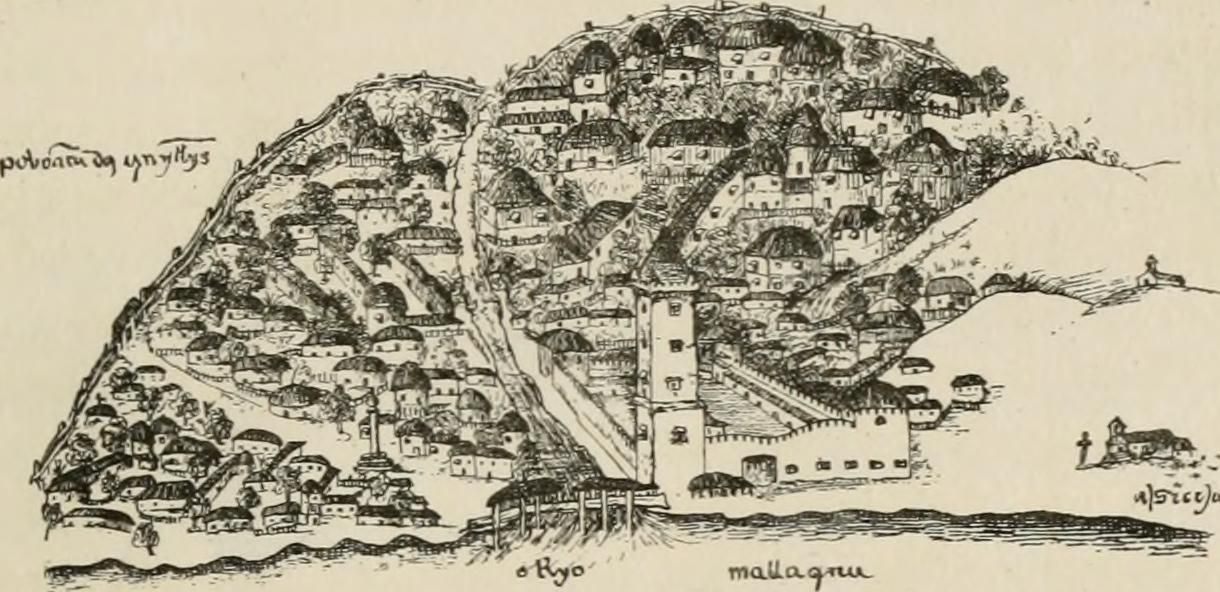
- Portuguese Malacca in Lendas da India by Gaspar Correia, c. 1550–1563.
- Status: Portuguese colony
- Capital: Malacca Town
- Common languages: Portuguese; Malay
- King of Portugal
  - 1511–1521: Manuel I
  - 1640–1641: John IV
- Captains-major
  - 1512–1514 (first): Rui de Brito Patalim
  - 1638–1641 (last): Manuel de Sousa Coutinho
- Captains-general
  - 1616–1635 (first): António Pinto da Fonseca
  - 1637–1641 (last): Luís Martins de Sousa Chichorro
- Historical era: Age of Imperialism
  - Captured: 15 August 1511
  - Dutch conquest: 14 January 1641
- Currency: Portuguese real
Preceded by	Succeeded by
Malacca Sultanate	Dutch Malacca

Portuguese control of Malacca—a city on the Malay Peninsula—spanned a 130 year period from 1511 to 1641 as a possession of the Portuguese East Indies. It was captured from the Malacca Sultanate as part of Portuguese attempts to gain control of trade in the region. Although multiple attempts to conquer it were repulsed, the city was eventually lost to an alliance of Dutch and regional forces, thus beginning a period of Dutch rule.

== History ==
According to the 16th-century Portuguese historian Emanuel Godinho de Erédia, the site of the old city of Malacca was named after the malacca tree (Phyllanthus emblica), fruit-bearing trees along the banks of a river called Airlele (Ayer Leleh). The Airlele river was said to originate from Buquet China (present-day Bukit Cina). Eredia cited that the city was founded by Permicuri (i.e. Parameswara) the first King of Malacca in 1411.

=== The capture of Malacca ===
Malacca's wealth attracted the attention of the King of Portugal, Manuel I, who sent captain-major Diogo Lopes de Sequeira to make contact with Malacca and sign a trade agreement with its ruler. The first European to reach Southeast Asia, Sequeira arrived in Malacca in 1509. Although he was initially well received by Sultan Mahmud Shah, trouble quickly ensued. The general feeling of rivalry between Islam and Christianity was invoked by a group of Muslims in the sultan's court. The international Muslim trading community convinced Mahmud that the Portuguese were a threat. Mahmud subsequently turned on the Portuguese and attacked the four ships in the harbour, killing some and capturing several of them, who were then imprisoned in Malacca and tortured. As the Portuguese had found in India, conquest would be the only way they could establish themselves in Malacca.

In April 1511, Afonso de Albuquerque set sail from Goa to Malacca with a force of around 1,200 men and seventeen or eighteen ships. Albuquerque made a number of demands, one of which was for permission to build a fortress as a Portuguese trading post near the city where they could trade safely. The sultan refused, and after 40 days of fighting, Malacca fell to the Portuguese on 24 August with Sultan Mahmud Shah fleeing the city. A dispute between Sultan Mahmud and his son Sultan Ahmad also weighed down on the Malaccan side.

Following the defeat of the Malacca Sultanate, Afonso de Albuquerque sought to erect a fort in anticipation of the counterattacks by Sultan Mahmud. A fortress was designed and constructed near a hill, south of the river mouth, on the former site of the mosque. Albuquerque remained in Malacca until November 1511 preparing its defences against any Malay counterattack.

=== A Portuguese port in a hostile region ===
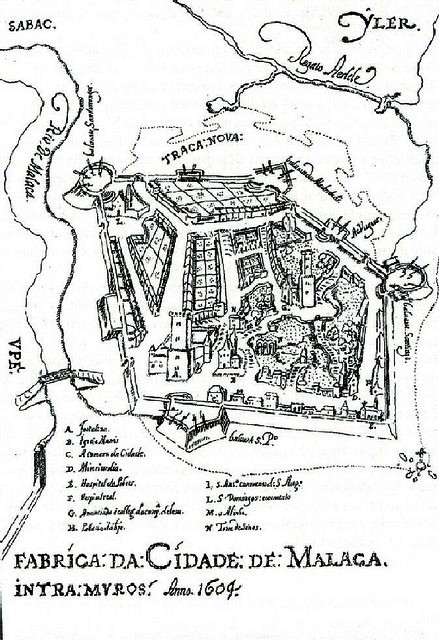
Construction of Malacca City: Intramuros Anno 1604 by Manuel Godinho de Eredia

Portuguese Malacca faced severe hostility as it was the first European Christian trading settlement in Southeast Asia, being surrounded by numerous emerging Muslim states. They endured years of conflicts with Malay sultans who wanted to get rid of the Portuguese and reclaim the port town. The sultan made several attempts to retake the capital. He rallied the support from his ally the Sultanate of Demak in Java who, in 1511, agreed to send naval forces to assist. Led by Pati Unus, the Sultan of Demak, the combined Malay–Java efforts failed. The Portuguese retaliated and forced the sultan to flee to Pahang. Later, the sultan sailed to Bintan Island and established a new capital there. With a base established, the sultan rallied the disarrayed Malay forces and organized several attacks and blockades against the Portuguese's position. Frequent raids on Malacca caused the Portuguese severe hardship. In 1521 the Sultanate of Demak began a second campaign to assist the Malay sultan to retake Malacca which failed and cost of the Sultan of Demak his life. He was later remembered as Pangeran Sabrang Lor or the Prince who crossed (the Java Sea) to North (Malay Peninsula). The raids helped convince the Portuguese that the exiled sultan's forces must be silenced. A number of attempts were made to suppress the Malay forces, but it was not until 1526 that the Portuguese finally razed Bintan to the ground. The sultan then retreated to Kampar in Riau, Sumatra where he died two years later. He left behind two sons named Muzaffar Shah and Alauddin Riayat Shah II.

Muzaffar Shah was invited by the people in the north of the peninsula to become their ruler, establishing the Sultanate of Perak. Mahmud's other son, Alauddin succeeded his father and made a new capital in the south, creating the Johor Sultanate.

The Sultan of Johor made several attempts to end Portuguese rule in Malacca. A request sent to Java in 1550 resulted in Ratu Kalinyamat, queen regnant of Jepara, sending 4,000 soldiers aboard 40 ships to aid Johor in taking Malacca. The Jepara troops joined forces with the Malay alliance and managed to assemble around 200 warships for the upcoming assault. The combined forces attacked from the north and captured most of Malacca, but the Portuguese managed to retaliate and force back the invading forces. The Malay alliance troops were pushed back to the sea, while the Jepara troops remained on shore, withdrawing only after their leaders were killed. The battle continued on the beach and in the sea resulting in more than 2,000 Jepara soldiers being killed. A storm stranded two Jepara ships on the shore of Malacca where they were attacked by the Portuguese. Fewer than half of the Jepara soldiers managed to leave Malacca.

In 1568, Prince Husain Ali I Riayat Syah from the Sultanate of Aceh launched a naval attack to oust the Portuguese from Malacca, but was met with failure. In 1574 a combined attack from the Aceh Sultanate and the Javanese Jepara tried again to capture Malacca from the Portuguese, but ended in failure due to poor coordination.

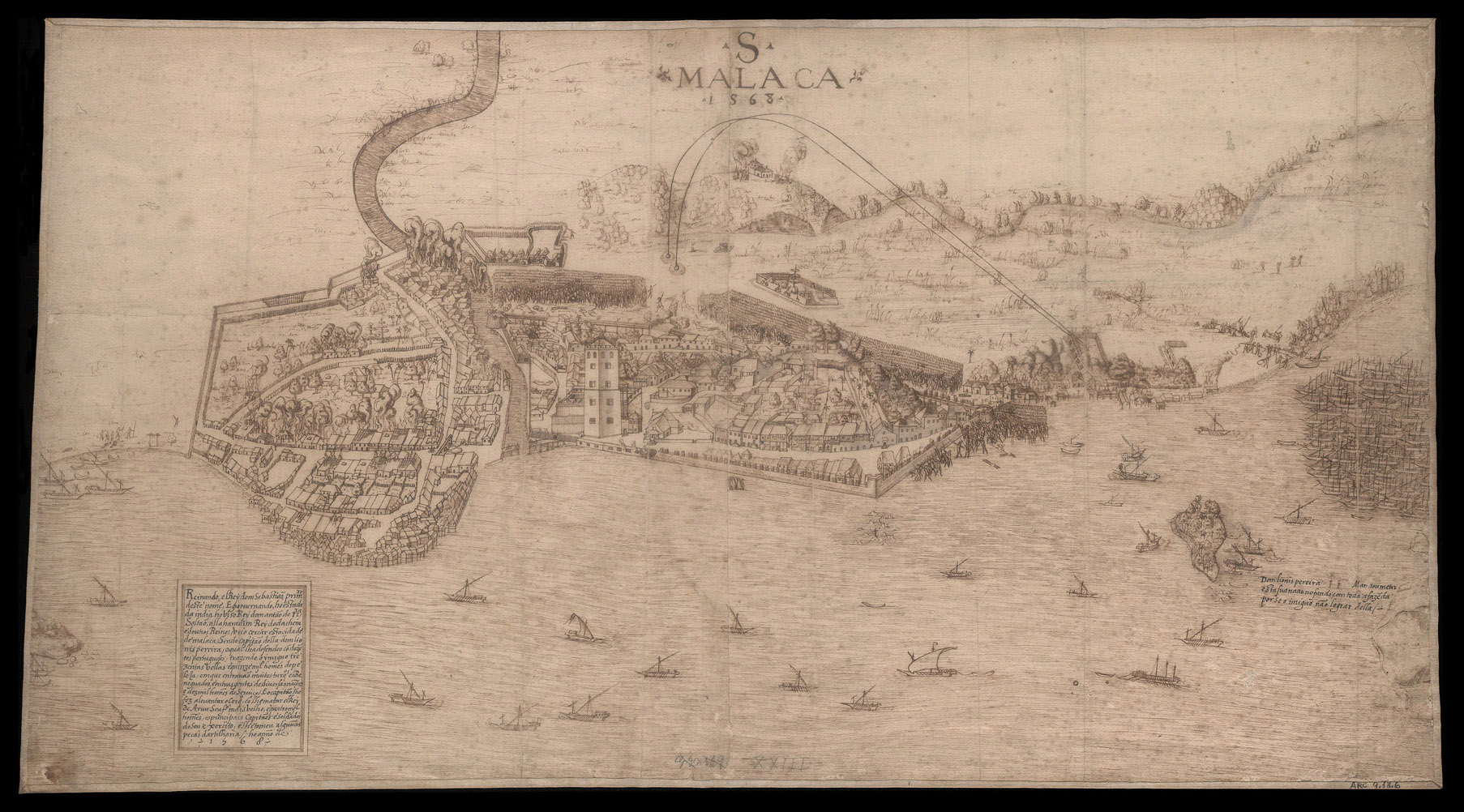
Siege of Malacca by the Acehnese in 1568.

Competition from other ports such as Johor saw Asian traders bypass Malacca and the city began to decline as a trading port. Rather than achieving their ambition of dominating it, the Portuguese had fundamentally disrupted the organisation of the Asian trade network. Rather than being a centralised port of regional exchange, and having been made an authority to police the Strait of Malacca that ensured safety for commercial traffic, trade was instead scattered over a number of ports that experienced warfare among each other.

=== Chinese reaction ===
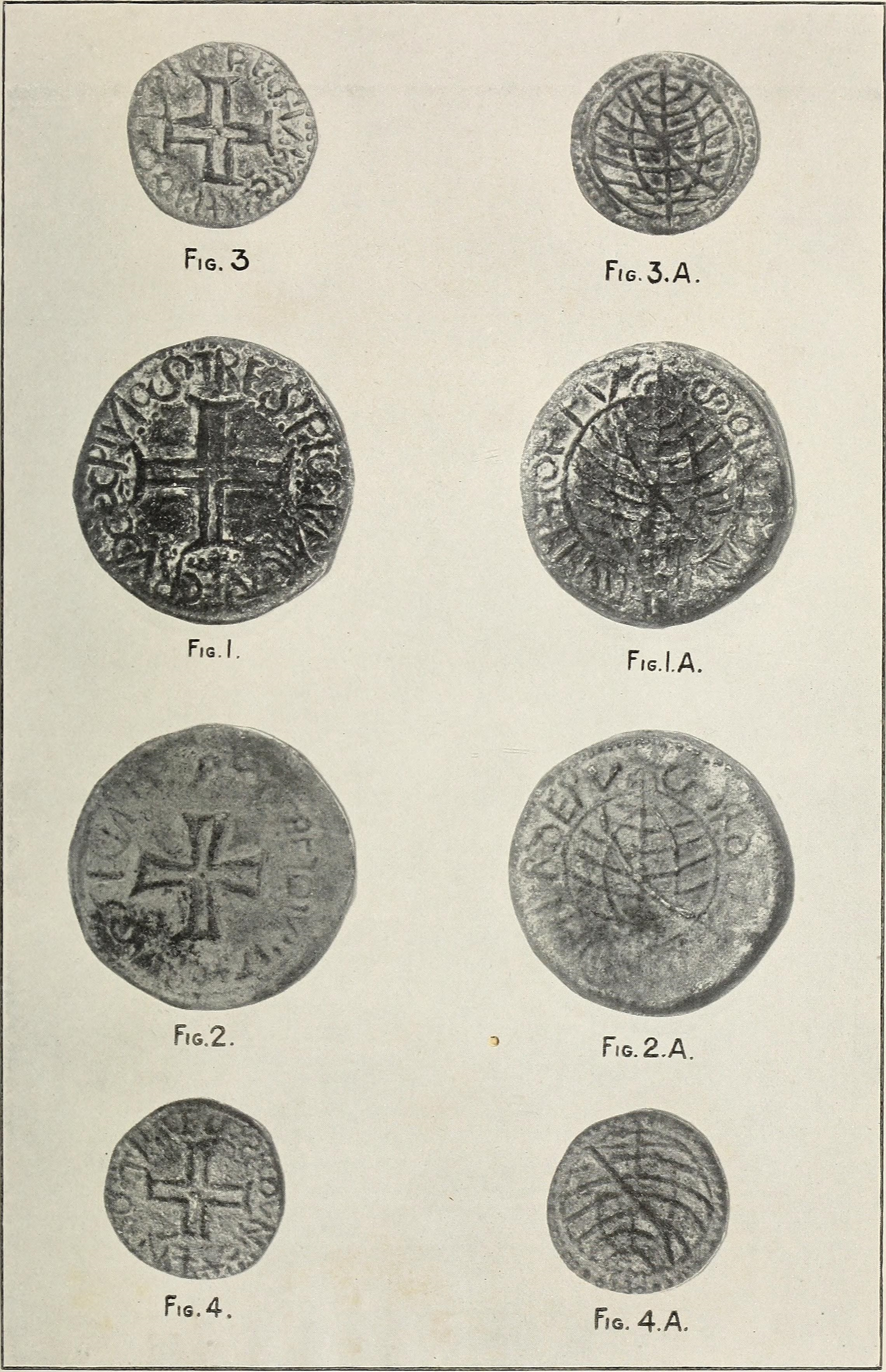
Portuguese Malacca tin coins of King Emmanuel (1495–1521) and John III (1521–1557) period were discovered during an excavation near the Malacca River mouth by W. Edgerton, Resident Councilor of Malacca in 1900.

Malacca harboured a community of Chinese merchants, probably from Fujian and other places, who left China in defiance of Ming laws. They were probably not treated well by the sultan, as all or almost all supported the Portuguese and helped them establish relations with neighbouring countries. They had much to gain both from the protection and connections the Portuguese could offer.

China was first contacted in 1513 by Jorge Álvares, who sailed from Malacca in a fleet of five junks and set foot on an island in the Pearl River Delta, and erected a padrão. He was followed by Rafael Perestrello, who landed in continental China proper and traded profitably at Guangzhou. The protection which Albuquerque provided to the resident Chinese merchants ensured that they were well received.

On 17 June 1517 a fleet of eight ships under the command of Fernão Peres de Andrade reached Guangzhou with an embassy from King Manuel I of Portugal, the ambassador Tomé Pires disembarked with pomp and circumstance and was well received by the Chinese authorities who came to see him with great ceremony. Pires and his companions received one of the best houses in the city and received frequent visits from distinguished residents. Andrade moved his ships to the Island of Tamão, where he obtained authorization from the Ming authorities to open a trade post and declared that anyone who had demands on the Portuguese should appeal to him, which gave the Chinese a high opinion of the integrity of the Portuguese.

Pires reached Beijing in January 1521 but an ambassador from Sultan Mahmud appealed to Emperor Zhengde for aid against the Portuguese. Zhengde died shortly afterwards and his successor Jiajing ruled that the Portuguese embassy would be held hostage at Guangzhou, until the Portuguese had restored the city to Sultan Mahmud. Most or all of the members of the embassy were robbed of their belongings and imprisoned, many dying in captivity or being executed. Portuguese presence in China banned, though many Portuguese continued to sail from Malacca to engage in trade or smuggling.

Relations with China gradually improved and aid was given against the Wokou pirates along China's shores, by 1557 Ming China agreed to allow the Portuguese to settle at Macau. The Sultanate of Johor also improved relations with the Portuguese and fought alongside them against the Aceh Sultanate.

=== Dutch conquest and the end of Portuguese Malacca ===
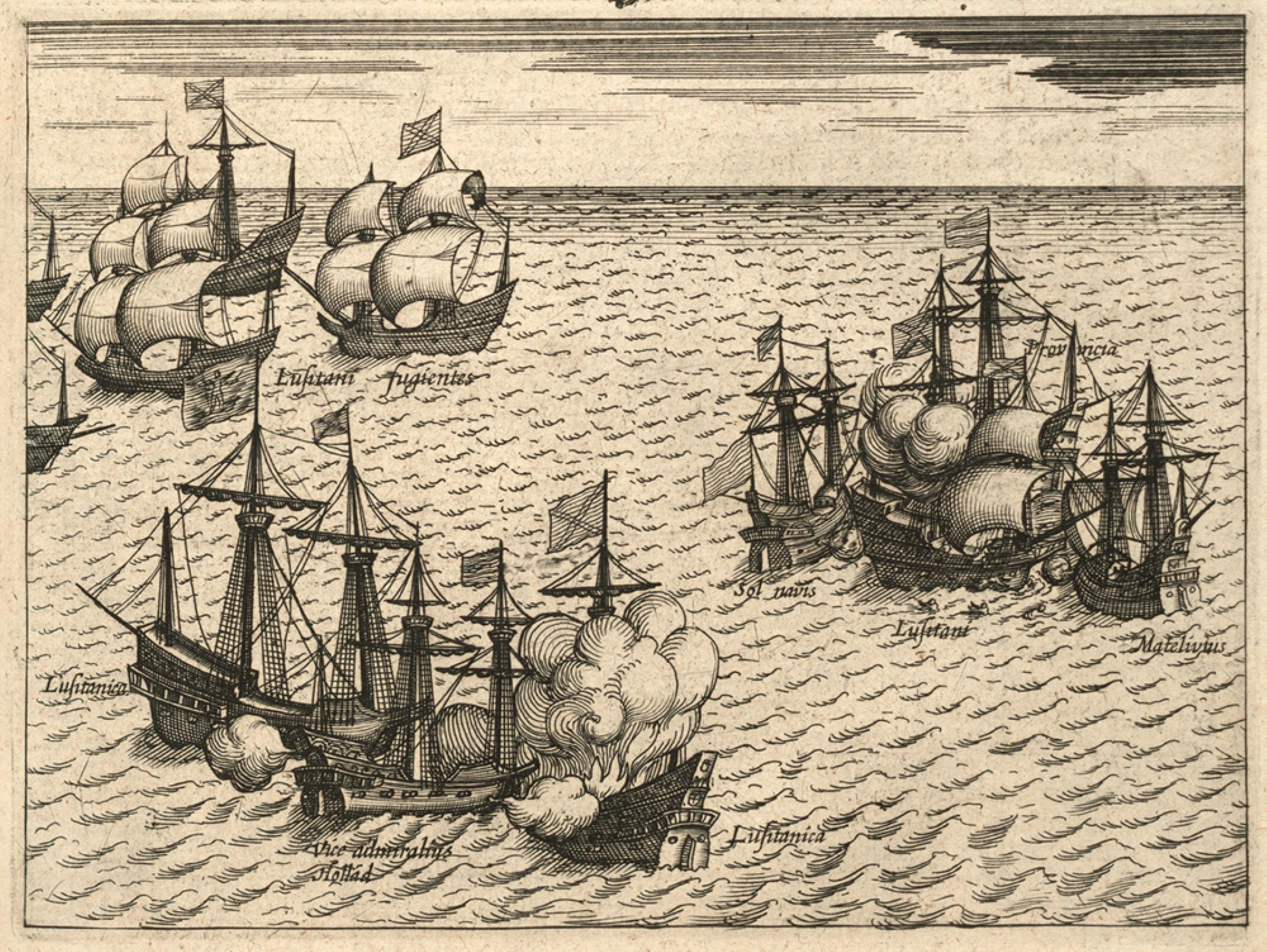
Naval battle between Portuguese and Dutch East India Company ships.

By the early 17th century, the Dutch East India Company (Dutch: Verenigde Oostindische Compagnie, VOC) began contesting Portuguese power in the East. At that time, the Portuguese had transformed Malacca into an impregnable fortress, the Fortaleza de Malaca, controlling access to the sea lanes of the Strait of Malacca and the spice trade in the region, where it repulsed an attack from Aceh in 1568. The Dutch started by launching small incursions and skirmishes against the Portuguese. The first serious attempt was the siege of Malacca in 1606 by the third VOC fleet with eleven ships, commanded by Admiral Cornelis Matelief de Jonge that led to the battle of Cape Rachado. Although the Dutch were routed, the Portuguese fleet of Martim Afonso de Castro, the Viceroy of Goa, suffered heavier casualties and the battle rallied the forces of the Sultanate of Johor into an alliance with the Dutch and later on with the Aceh Sultanate. The Dutch attacked Malacca again in 1616.

Around that same time period, the Sultanate of Aceh had grown into a regional power with a formidable naval force and regarded Portuguese Malacca as a potential threat. In 1629, Iskandar Muda of the Aceh Sultanate sent several hundred ships to attack Malacca, but the mission was a devastating failure. According to Portuguese sources, all his ships were destroyed and lost some 19,000 men in the process.

The Dutch with their local allies assaulted and captured Malacca from the Portuguese in January 1641. This combined Dutch–Johor–Aceh efforts effectively destroyed the last bastion of Portuguese power, reducing their influence in the archipelago. The Dutch settled in the city as Dutch Malacca, however the Dutch had no intention to make Malacca their main base, and concentrated on building Batavia (today Jakarta) as their headquarters in the orient instead. The Portuguese ports in the spice-producing Maluku Islands also fell to the Dutch in the following years. With these conquests, the last Portuguese colonies in Asia remained confined to Goa, Daman and Diu in Portuguese India, Portuguese Timor and Macau until the 20th century.

== Fortress of Malacca ==
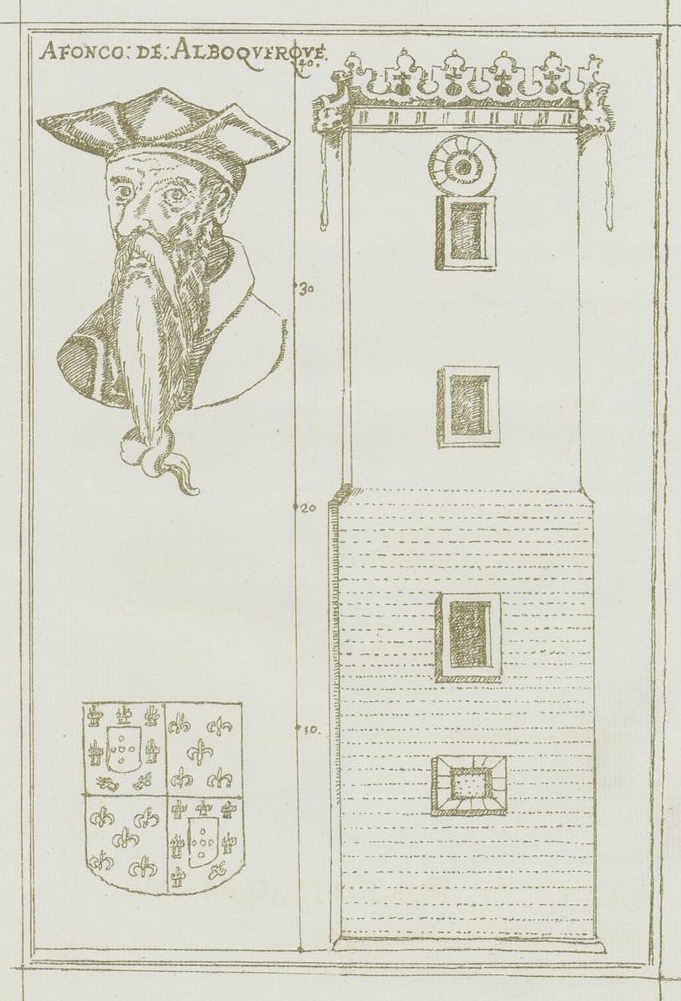
A Famosa proper, the keep of the fortress of Malacca.

The early core of the fortress system was a quadrilateral tower called Fortaleza de Malaca. Measurements were given as 10 fathoms per side with a height of 40 fathoms. It was constructed at the foot of the fortress hill, next to the sea. A circular wall of mortar and stone with a well in the middle was constructed to its east.

Over the years, constructions began to fully fortify the fortress hill. The pentagonal system began at the farthest point of the cape near south-east of the river mouth, towards the west of the Fortaleza. At this point two ramparts were built at right angles to each other lining the shores. The one running northward toward the river mouth was 130 fathoms in length to the bastion of São Pedro while the other one ran for 75 fathoms to the east, curving inshore, ending at the gate and bastion of Santiago.

From the bastion of São Pedro the rampart turned north east 150 fathoms past the Custom House Terrace gateway ending at the northernmost point of the fortress, the bastion of São Domingos. From the gateway of São Domingos, an earth rampart ran south-east for 100 fathoms ending at the bastion of the Madre de Deus. From here, beginning at the gate of Santo António, past the bastion of the Virgins, the rampart ended at the gateway of Santiago. Overall, the city enclosure was 655 fathoms and 10 palms (short) of a fathom.

=== Gateways ===
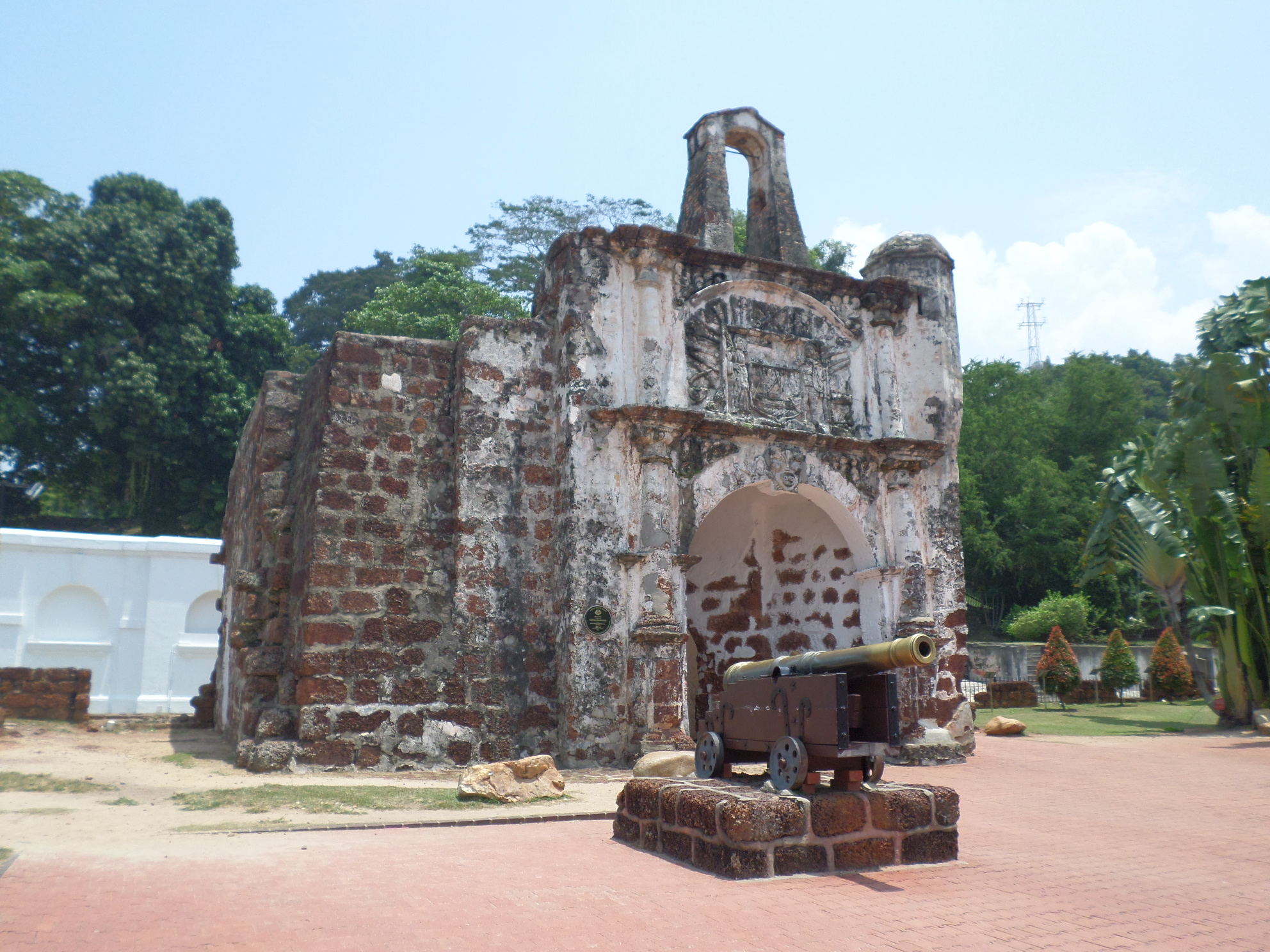
Present day Porta de Santiago

Four gateways were built for the city:

1. Porta de Santiago
2. The gateway of the Custom House Terrace
3. Porta de São Domingos
4. Porta de Santo António

Of these four gateways only two were in common use and open to traffic: the Gate of Santo António linking to the suburb of Yler and the western gate at the Custom House Terrace, giving access to Tranqueira and its bazaar.

=== Legacy ===
After almost 300 years of existence, in 1806, the British, unwilling to maintain the fortress and wary of letting other European powers take control of it, ordered its slow destruction. The fort was almost totally demolished but for the timely intervention of Sir Stamford Raffles visiting Malacca in 1810. The only remnants of the earliest Portuguese fortress in Southeast Asia is the Porta de Santiago, now known as the A Famosa.

== Districts of Malacca town during Portuguese rule ==
Malacca was the most thoroughly described city in south-east Asia during the 16th and 17th century as a result of it being under Portuguese control. Outside of the fortified town centre were the three suburbs of Malacca. The suburb of Upe (Upih), generally known as Tranqueira (modern day Tengkera) from the rampart of the fortress. The other two suburb were Yler (Hilir) or Tanjonpacer (Tanjung Pasir) and the suburb of Sabba.

=== Tranqueira ===
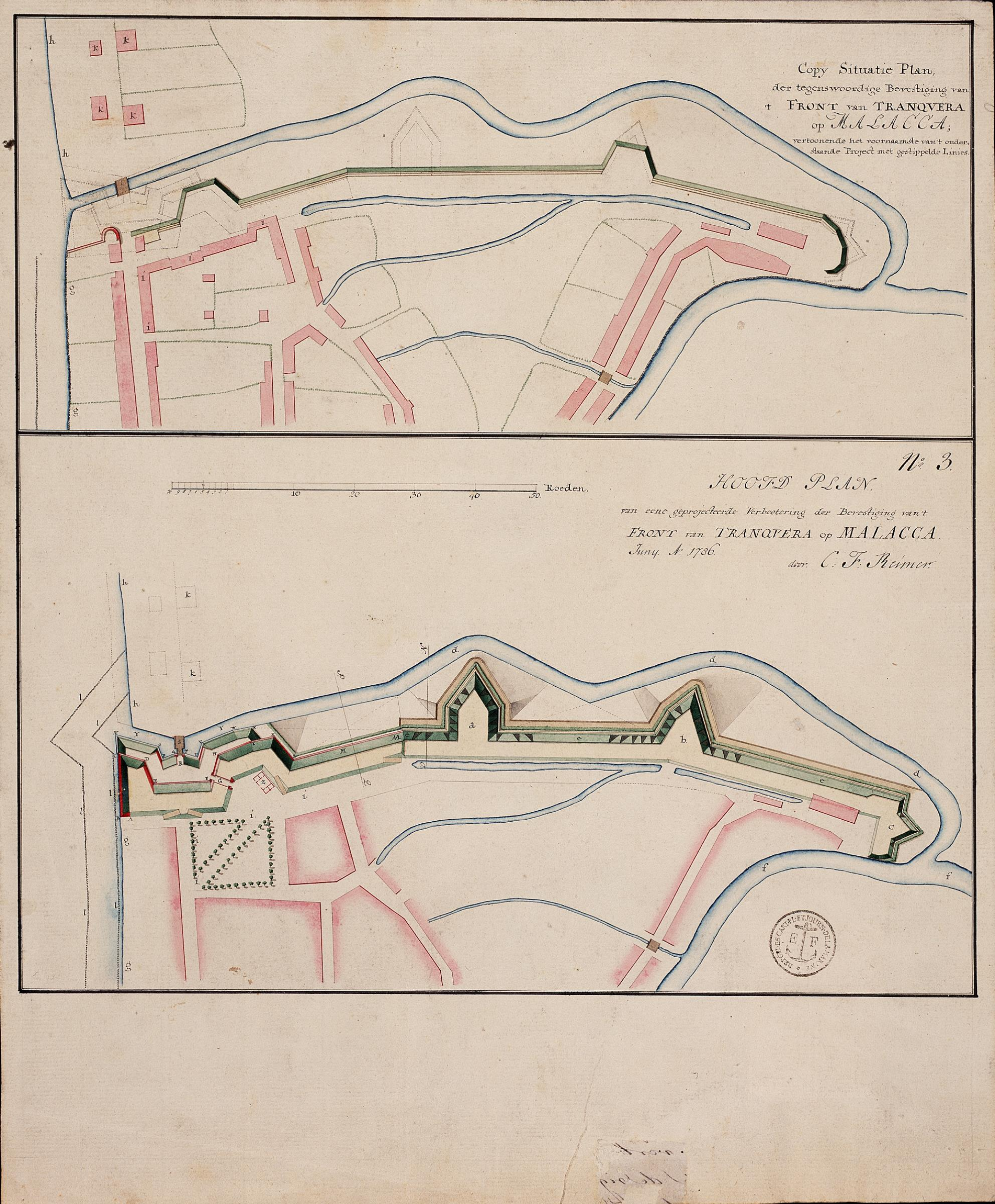
The Fort of Tranquera at Malacca by Carl Friedrich Reimer, 1786

The suburb was rectangular in shape, with a northern border wall, the Strait of Malacca to the south and the Malacca River and the fortaleza's wall to the east. It was the main residential quarters of the city. However, in war, the residents of the quarters would be evacuated to the fortress. Tranqueira was divided into a further two parishes, São Tomé and São Estêvão. The parish of S.Tomé was called Campon Chelim (Malay: Kampung Keling). It was described that this area was populated by the Chelis of Choromandel. The other suburb of São Estêvão was also called Campon China (Kampung Cina).

Erédia described the houses as made of timber but roofed by tiles. A stone bridge with sentry crossed the Malacca River to provide access to the Malacca Fortress via the eastern Custome House Terrace. The centre of trade of the city was also located in Tranqueira near the beach on the mouth of the river called the Bazaar of the Jaos (Jowo/Jawa i.e. Javanese). In the present day, this part of the city is called Tengkera.

=== Yler ===
The district of Yler (Hilir) roughly covered Buquet China (Bukit Cina) and the south-eastern coastal area. The Well of Buquet China was one of the most important water sources for the community. Notable landmarks included the Church of the Madre De Deus and the Convent of the Capuchins of São Francisco. Other notable landmarks included Buquetpiatto (Bukit Piatu). The boundaries of this unwalled suburb were said to extend as far as Buquetpipi and Tanjonpacer.

Tanjonpacer (Malay: Tanjung Pasir) was later renamed Ujong Pasir. A community descended from Portuguese settlers is still located there in present-day Malacca. However, this suburb of Yler is now known as Banda Hilir. Modern land reclamations (for the purpose of building the commercial district of Melaka Raya) have, removed Banda Hilir's sea access that it formerly had.

=== Sabba ===
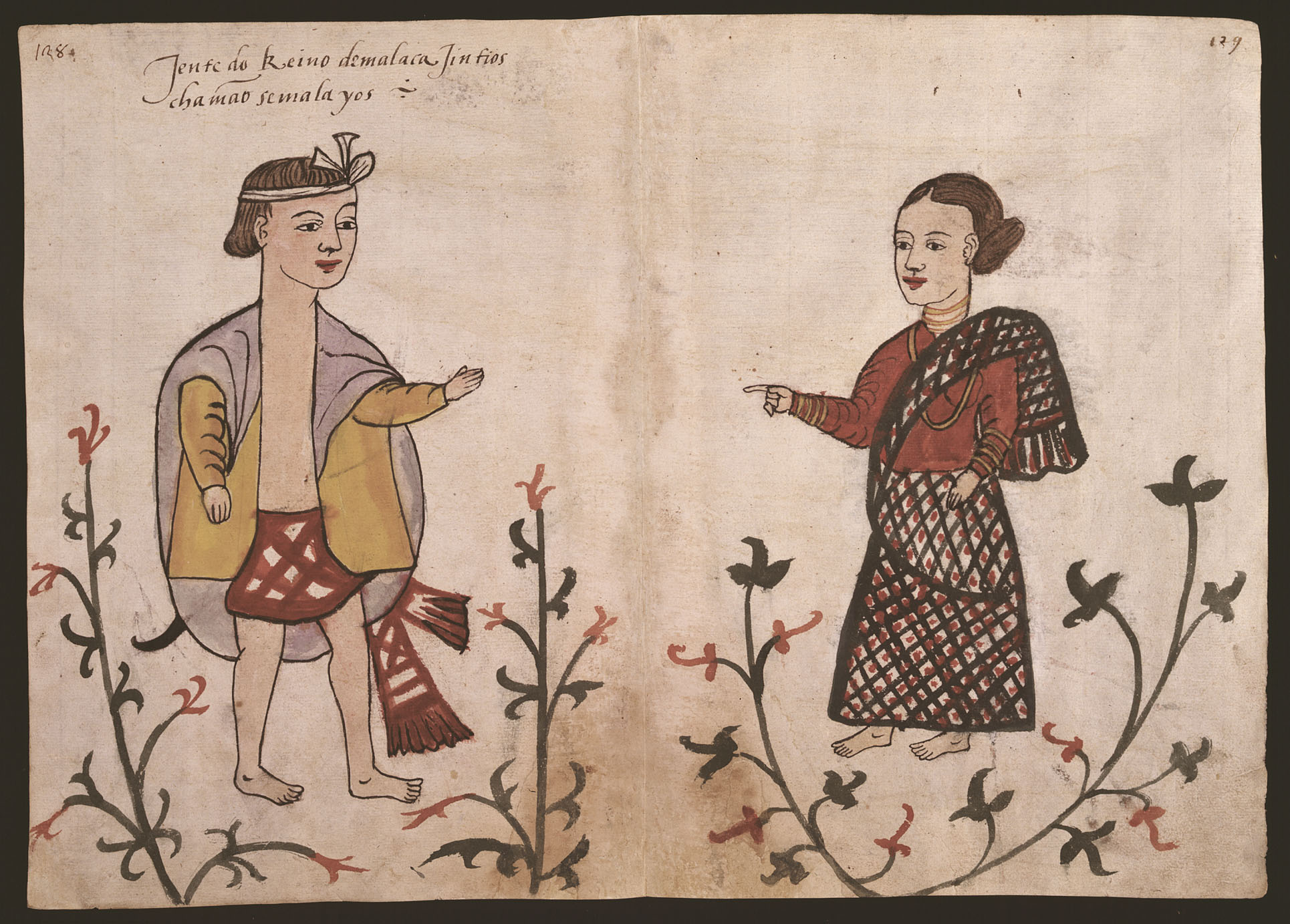
Malays of Malacca, depicted by the Portuguese in the Códice Casanatense.

The houses of this suburb were built along the edges of the river. Some of the original Muslim Malay inhabitants of Malacca lived in the swamps of nypeiras tree, where they were known to make nypa (nipah) wine for trade. This suburb was considered the most rural, being a transition to the Malacca hinterland, where timber and charcoal traffic passed through into the city. Several Christian parishes also lay outside the city along the river; São Lázaro, Our Lady of Guadalupe and Our Lady of Hope. While Muslim Malays inhabited the farmlands deeper into the hinterland.

In later periods of Dutch, British and modern-day Malacca, the name of Sabba was made obsolete. However, its area encompassed parts of what is now Banda Kaba, Bunga Raya and Kampung Jawa within the modern city centre of Malacca.

== Portuguese immigration ==
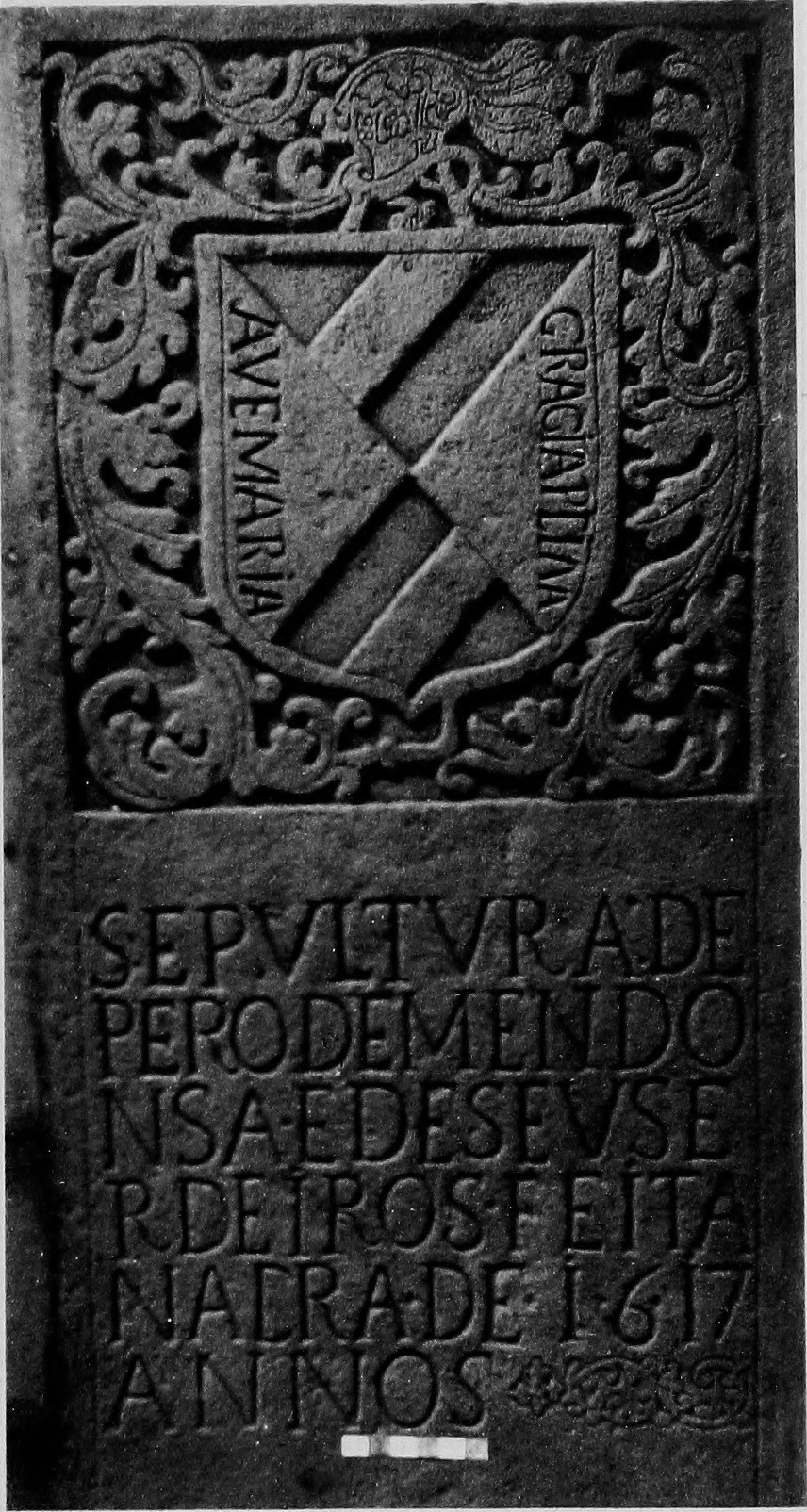
Portuguese tombstone at Malacca.

Portuguese residents were separated into five major subgroups:

- Soldados, or the soldier class consisting of single men who had the duty of defending the city if it came under attack.
- Casados, or settlers made up of married settlers. These group of people were directly ruled under the Portuguese formal administration and were made up of fidalgos, retired soldados and lower class citizens who migrated there. Since the composition was disproportionately male, these settlers married local Asian natives, leading to children of interracial descent.
- Moradores, or informal settlers who were not under the authority of the formal administration, settling in regions outside of the Portuguese formal eye with Portuguese permission. They were often merchants and established long-term settlements.
- Ministrios, or crown-appointed officials meant for short term-stay. This included the captain-major. Other officials included the ouvidor (crown magistrate) and vedor da fazenda (financial superintendent).
- Religioso, or ecclesiastical class. These were made of Catholic officials sent from with papal blessing to the Bishopric of Malacca which was placed under the purview of the Archbishopric in Goa, established in 1557. The Catholic priests were from the Capuchins, Augustinians and Dominican orders. Malacca was also used as an intermediary stop for Jesuit priests heading to Japan and China and included Francis Xavier.

The Portuguese also shipped over many Órfãs do Rei to Portuguese colonies overseas in Africa and India, and also to Portuguese Malacca. Órfãs do Rei literally translates to "Orphans of the King", and they were Portuguese girl orphans sent to overseas colonies to marry Portuguese settlers.

== Portuguese administration of Malacca ==
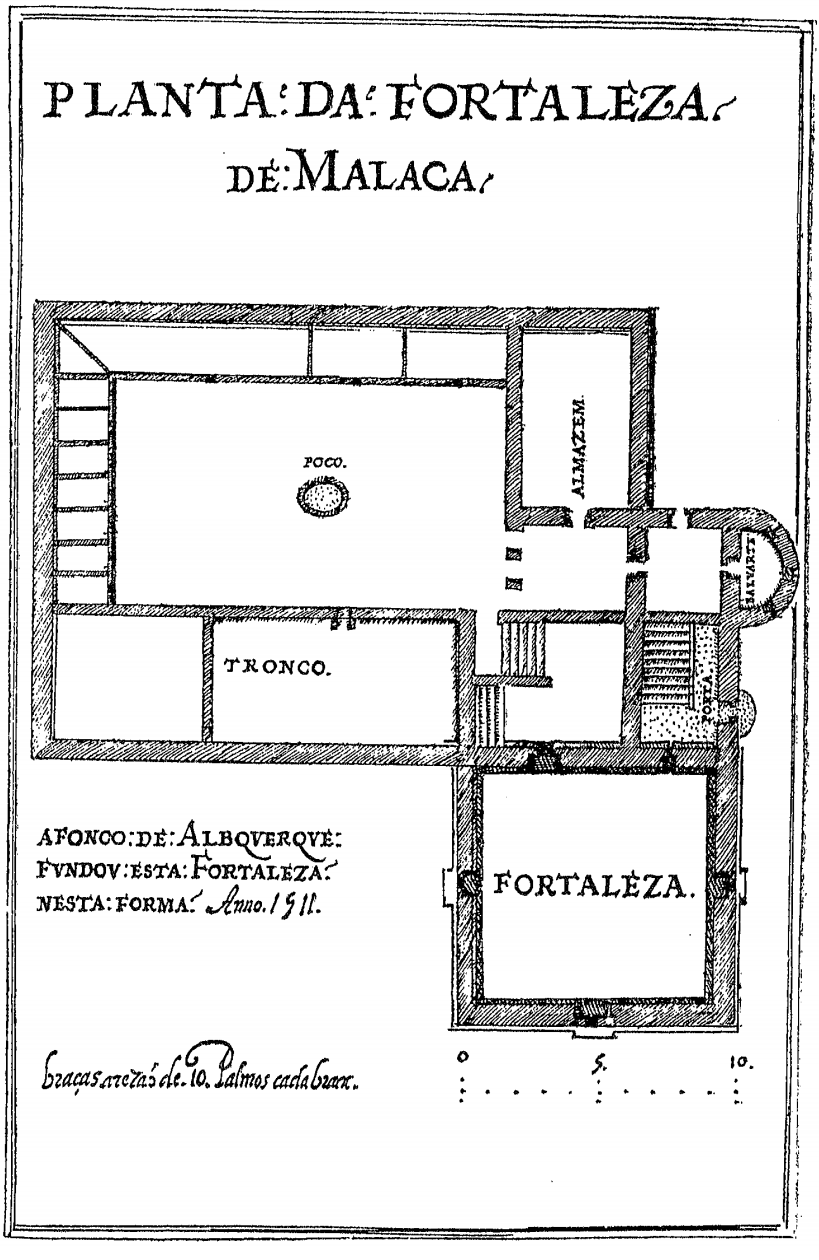
Floorplan of the Malacca citadel.

Portuguese Malacca was placed under the authority of Portuguese India, based in Goa with its governor/viceroy overseeing its rule. Malacca itself was administered by the captain-major whose office was located inside the Fortaleza.

In 1552, Malacca was granted a charter to become a city equipped with its own city senate which normally consisted of fidalgos, procuradores dos mesteres (trade guild representatives) and citizens acting on behalf of marginalised groups. The city senate represented the interests of the casados who would use it to communicate with the Portuguese Crown.

The other major organisation present in the city was the Misericordia or the House of Mercy which was a fraternity dedicated to providing aid, medicine and rudimentary education to the Christians of Malacca regardless of background. The body of administration was called the mesa and headed by a provedor. They also acted as financial executors for those who willed their assets to the Misericordia.

With regards to native matters, the administrative structure of Malacca pre-conquest remained largely unchanged. Afonso de Albuquerque initially wanted the sultan to return and rule under the Portuguese eye. The posts of bendahara, temenggung and shahbandar were maintained and appointed from among the non-muslims of Malacca.

In 1571, an attempt was made by King Sebastian to establish three separate entities of his Asian colonial holdings with Malacca being one sector under its own governor, though this effort did not come to fruition.

According to Eredia in 1613, Malacca was administered by a governor (a captain-major), who was appointed for a term of three-years, as well as a bishop and church dignitaries representing the episcopal see, municipal officers, royal officials for finance and justice and a local native bendahara to administer the native Muslims and foreigners under the Portuguese jurisdiction.

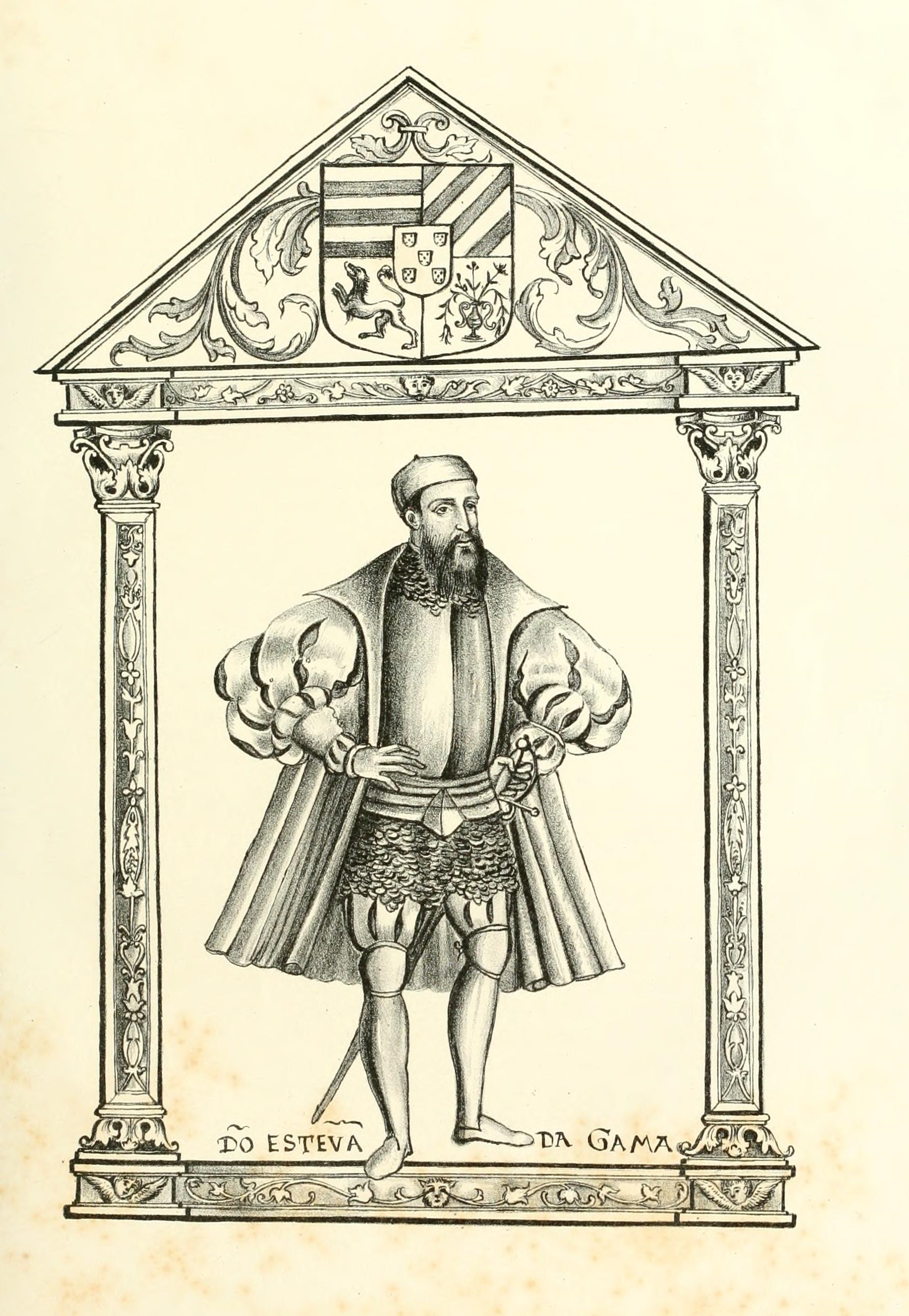
Dom Estevão da Gama, son of Vasco da Gama, captain of Malacca between 1534 and 1539.

Captains of Malacca (1512–1641)
No.	Captain Major	From	Until	Monarch
1	Ruy de Brito Patalim	1512	1514	Manuel I
2	Jorge de Alburquerque (1st time)	1514	1516	Manuel I
3	Jorge de Brito	1516	1517	Manuel I
4	Nuno Vaz Pereira	1517	1518	Manuel I
5	Alfonso Lopes da Costa	1518	1520	Manuel I
6	Jorge de Alburquerque (2nd time)	1521	1525	Manuel I John III
7	Pedro Mascarenhas	1525	1526	John III
8	Jorge Cabral	1526	1528	John III
9	Pero de Faria	1528	1529	John III
10	Garcia de Sà (1st time)	1529	1533	John III
11	Dom Paulo da Gama	1533	1534	John III
12	Dom Estêvão da Gama	1534	1539	John III
13	Pero de Faria	1539	1542	John III
14	Ruy Vaz Pereira	1542	1544	John III
15	Simão Botelho	1544	1545	John III
16	Garcia de Sà (2nd time)	1545	1545	John III
17	Simão de Mello	1545	1548	John III
18	Dom Pedro da Silva da Gama	1548	1552	John III
19	Licenciado Francisco Alvares	1552	1552	John III
20	Dom Alvaro de Ata de Gama	1552	1554	John III
21	Dom Antonio de Noronha	1554	1556	John III
22	Dom João Pereira	1556	1557	John III
23	João de Mendonça	1557	1560	John III Sebastian I
24	Francisco Deça	1560	1560	Sebastian I
25	Diogo de Meneses	1564	1567	Sebastian I
26	Leonis Pereira	1567	1570	Sebastian I
27	Francisco da Costa	1570	1571	Sebastian I
28	António Moniz Barreto	1571	1573	Sebastian I
29	Miguel de Castro	1573	1573	Sebastian I
30	Leonis Pereira ou Francisco Henriques de Meneses	1573	1574	Sebastian I
31	Tristão Vaz da Veiga	1574	1575	Sebastian I
32	Miguel de Castro	1575	1577	Sebastian I
33	Aires de Saldanha	1577	1579	Sebastian I Henry I
34	João da Gama	1581	1582	Philip I
35	Roque de Melo	1582	1584	Philip I
36	João da Silva	1584	1587	Philip I
37	João Ribeiro Gaio	1587	1587	Philip I
38	Nuno Velho Pereira	1587	15xx	Philip I
39	Diogo Lobo	15xx	15xx	Philip I
40	Pedro Lopes de Sousa	15xx	1594	Philip I
41	Francisco da Silva Meneses	1597	1598	Philip I
42	Martim Afonso de Melo Coutinho	1598	1599	Philip I Phillip II
43	Fernão de Albuquerque	1599	1603	Phillip II
44	André Furtado de Mendonça	1603	1606	Phillip II
45	António de Meneses	1606	1607	Phillip II
46	Francisco Henriques	1610	1613	Phillip II
47	Gaspar Afonso de Melo	1613	1615	Phillip II
48	João Calado de Gamboa	1615	1615	Phillip II
49	António Pinto da Fonseca	1615	1616	Phillip II
50	João da Silveira	1617	1617	Phillip II
51	Pedro Lopes de Sousa	1619	1619	Phillip II
52	Filipe de Sousa ou Francisco Coutinho	1624	1624	Phillip III
53	Luis de Melo	162.	1626	Phillip III
54	Gaspar de Melo Sampaio	16xx	1634	Phillip III
55	Álvaro de Castro	1634	1635	Phillip III
56	Diogo de Melo e Castro	1630	1633	Phillip III
57	Francisco de Sousa de Castro	1630	1636	Phillip III
58	Diogo Coutinho Docem	1635	1637	Phillip III
59	Manuel de Sousa Coutinho	1638	1641	Phillip III John IV

== Military history ==
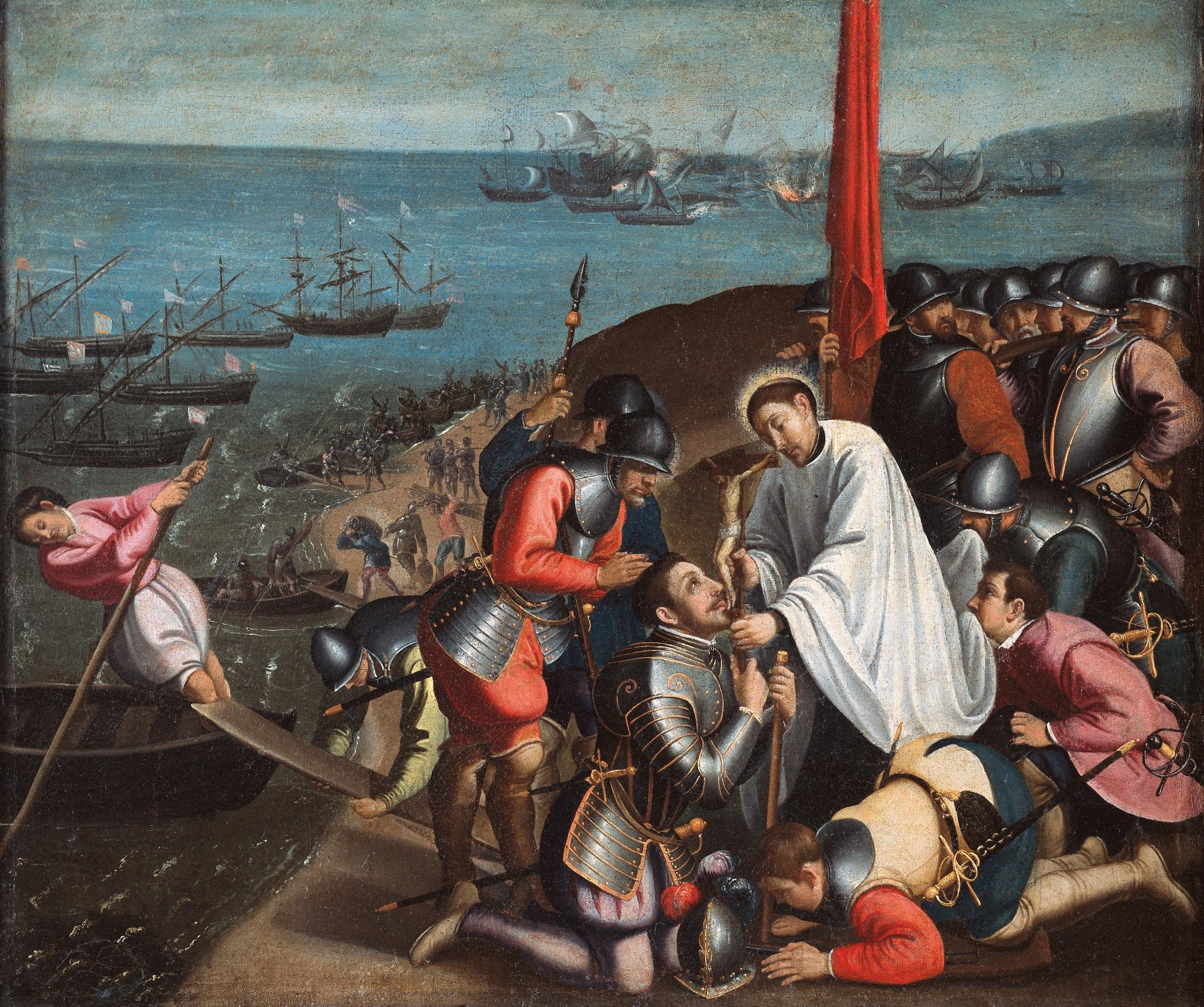
Portuguese soldiers in Malacca fighting the Acehnese, inspired by Saint Francis Xavier. 1619 painting by André Reinoso.

Portuguese Campaigns in the Strait of Malacca (1511–1641)
Year	Event
1511	Conquest of Malacca
1520	Battle of Pago
1521	Battle of Bintan
1521	Battle of Aceh
1522	Pedir Expedition
1523	Battle of Muar River
1524	Siege of Pasai
1524	Siege of Malacca
1525	Battle of Lingga
1526	Siege of Bintan
1528	Battle of Aceh
1535	First Battle of Ugentana
1536	Second Battle of Ugentana
1537	Siege of Malacca
1539	Siege of Malacca
1547	Battle of Perlis River
1551	Siege of Malacca
1568	Siege of Malacca
1569	Battle of Aceh
1570	First Battle of Formoso River
1573	Siege of Malacca
1574	Siege of Malacca
1575	Siege of Malacca
1587	Siege of Johor
1606	Battle of Aceh
1606	Siege of Malacca
1606	Battle of Cape Rachado
1607	Johor expedition
1615	Second Battle of Formoso River
1616	Battle of Malacca
1626	Siege of Malacca
1628	Battle of Langat River
1629	Battle of Duyon River
1641	Siege of Malacca

== Gallery ==
=== Currency ===
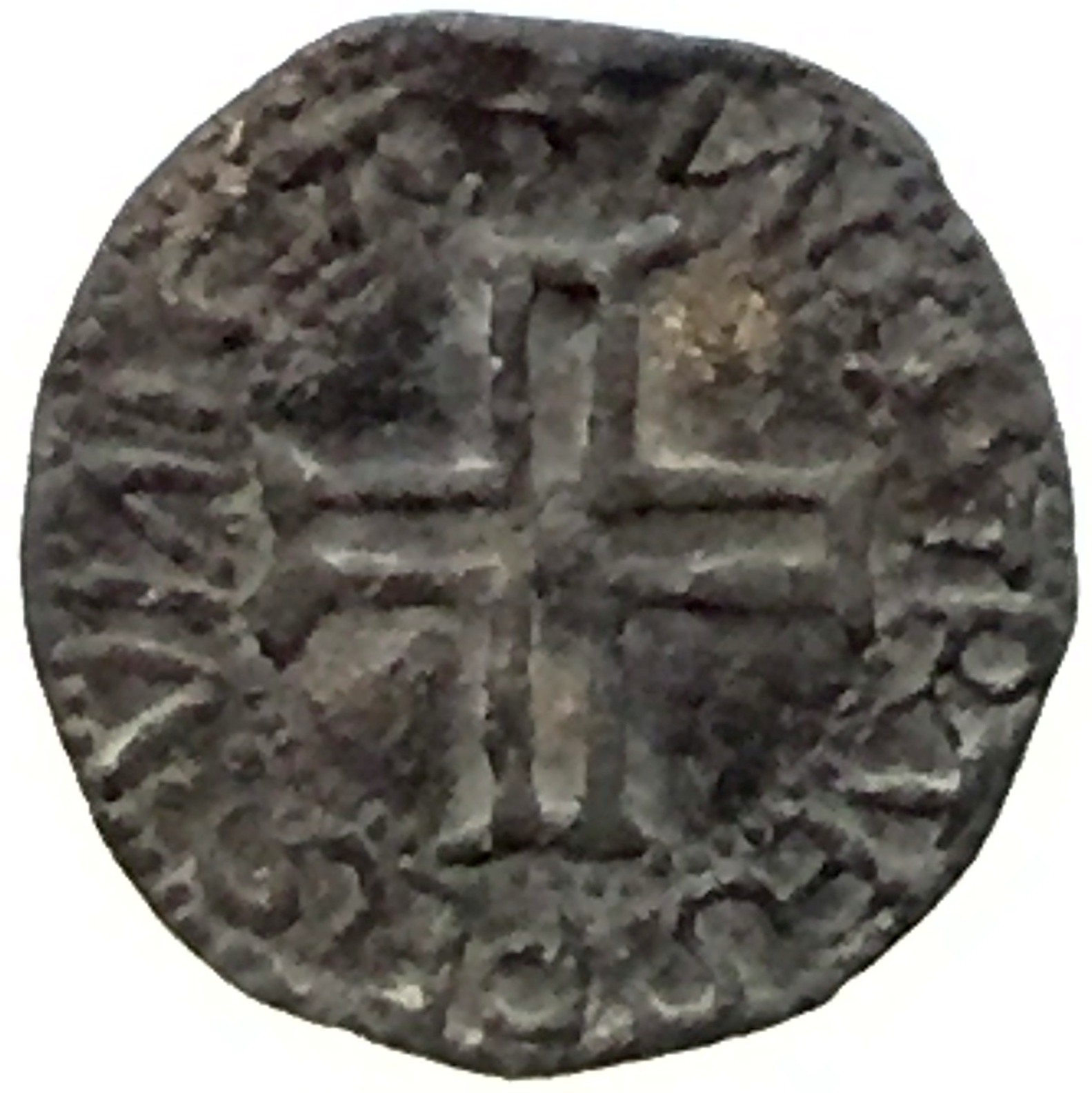
Portuguese Malacca soldo. Reign of Manuel I.

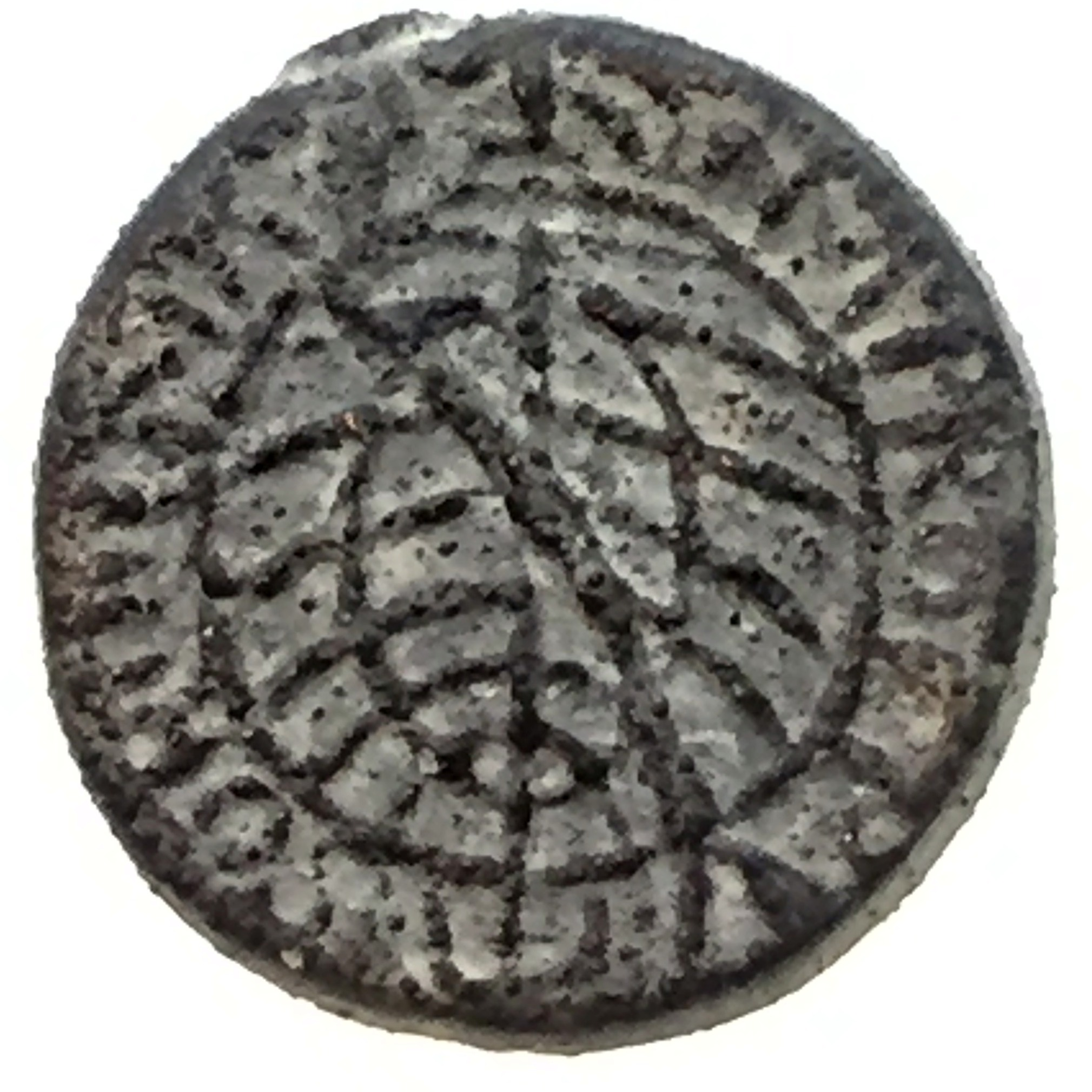
Portuguese Malacca bastardo. Reign of Manuel I.

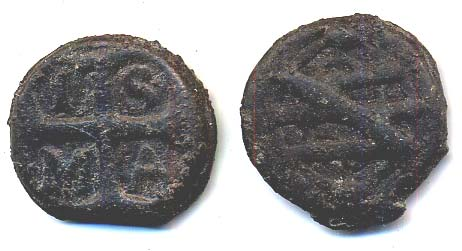
Portuguese Malacca tin dinheiro. Reign of John III

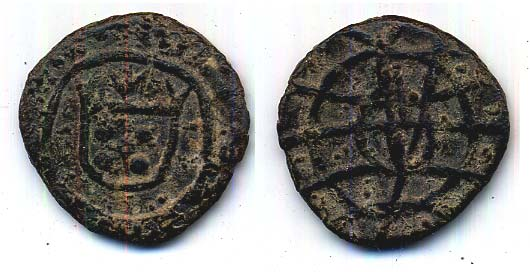
Portuguese Malacca tin dinheiro. Reign of John III

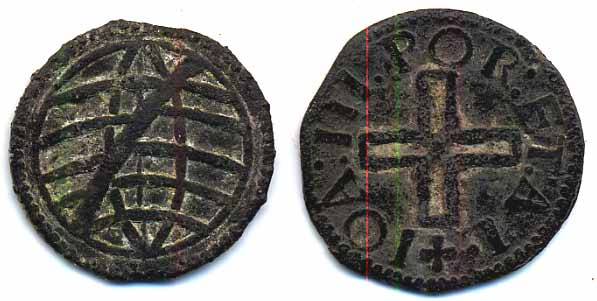
Portuguese Malacca tin dinheiro. Reign of John III

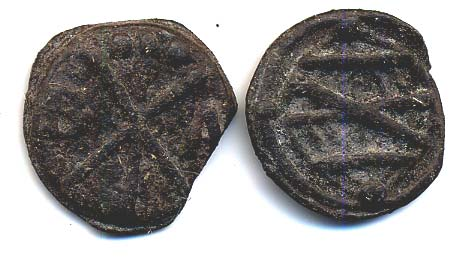
Portuguese Malacca tin soldo. Reign of Sebastian.

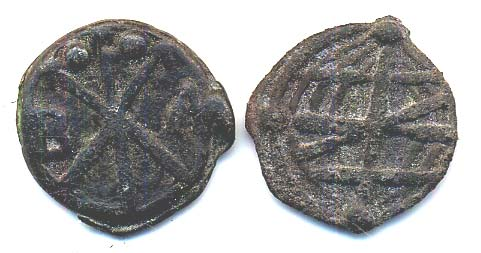
Portuguese Malacca tin dinheiro. Reign of Sebastian.

== See also ==
- Fortress of Malacca
- Portuguese Settlement, Malacca
- Portuguese Well
- Malay-Portuguese conflicts
- Acehnese-Portuguese conflicts
- Luso-Asians
- Códice Casanatense
