= Acehnese conquest of Pasai =

Acehnese Conquest of Pasai
- Part of Acehnese–Portuguese conflicts
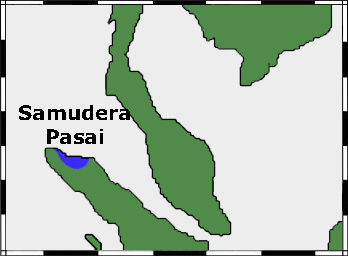
- Kingdom of Pasai
Date	1523–1524
Location	Pasai, Sumatra
Result	Acehnese victory

Belligerents
(Aceh Sultanate) Sultanate of Aceh	Samudera Pasai Sultanate; Portuguese Empire

Commanders and leaders
(Aceh Sultanate) Ali Mughayat Syah (Aceh Sultanate) Raja Lella	Andre Henriquez; Aires Coelho

Strength
15,000 men	Unknown Pasai Garrison; 350 Portuguese

Casualties and losses
2,000 killed	Heavy casualties both to Pasai and Portuguese

The Conquest of Pasai was a military campaign in 1523–1524 launched by the Sultanate of Aceh against the Samudera Pasai Sultanate and the Portuguese fortress there. The operation was a success for the Acehnese.

== Background ==
In the early 16th century, Pedir and Pasai had friendly relations with the Portuguese. Both of these cities were visited by Portuguese ambassadors with gifts from the King of Portugal, including pepper from Pasai. However, some incidents happened that led to the establishment of a Portuguese presence there. In 1516, Garcia de Sa, the governor of Malacca, sent Manuel Pacheco to attack Pasai.

In 1521, Zainal Abidin (Jeinal in Portuguese sources), a prince, revolted against the Sultan of Pasai, whom the Portuguese call "Orfacam." The deposed sultan asked the Portuguese for help; earlier, Jeinal massacred all Portuguese men in Pasai, which triggered the Portuguese reaction. Jorge de Albuquerque agreed to help restore the deposed sultan and arrived in Pasai with an army of 300 men. Jeinal army had 3000 men. At first Jorge attempted to force Jeinal to abdicate for Orfacem, but he refused, resulting in a battle in which Jeinal's army was routed and 2000 killed, while the Portuguese lost 5 or 6 dead. The sultan was restored to his throne and allowed the Portuguese to establish a fort there.

== Prelude ==
The Portuguese Governor of Pasai Fort, Andre Henriquez, observed that his situation was becoming critical; his garrison was in a poor state; many of them were sick and low on supplies; and the Pasai population was turning away from the Portuguese. Andre dispatched messages to Goa, demanding help, and sent them also to Aru Kingdom, an ally to Malacca, seeking help as they were a powerful kingdom. The Sultan of Aru promised him aid in Goa. dispatched supply ships led by Lopez De Azevedo to assist Andre, but a dispute happened between them, which led Lopez to leave for Malacca. After the conquest of Pedir, the Acehnese remained there for some time to consolidate their rule over Pedir.

== Conquest ==
in 1523, Raja Ibrahim sent his younger brother Raja Lella with a large army, he invaded the territories of Pasai and ravaged it for three months, Raja Lella established his camp within half league of the city and reported the conditions of Pasai, Ibrahim hastily joined him, in order to capture the city quickly before the arrival of reinforcements from Aru Kingdom, he proclaimed to the people of Pasai that he would grant Amnesty to anyone who would join Aceh authority within six-day, a great number of inhabitants came to his camp and granted them security on their families and properties, he then commenced military operations, after having two attacks repulsed, on the third attack he got the possession of the city and after a bloody fight, those who escaped took shelter in neighboring mountains and thick trees.

Having entered the city with 15,000 men, the Acehnese then turned to the Portuguese fort, and Ibrahim demanded Andre surrender his fort and deliver him the rulers of Pedir and Daya, whom he had given protection, but Andre, since he was sick at the time, relinquished his command to his brother-in-law Aires Coelho and took passage to West India, as he was traveling not far from Pasai, he met two Portuguese ships heading for the Maluku Islands. He intercepted them and told the captains of the ships about the situation of the fort, which they headed to help, Aires Coelho repulsed an Acehnese assault on the fort. The Acehnese renewed the assault with a force of 8000 men, while the Portuguese had 350 men, many of whom were sick or wounded. The Acehnese placed seven hundred ladders against the fort and mounted them with great shouts. A fierce hand-in-hand combat ensued until fire from the ships helped the garrison repulse the assault, and the Acehnese were forced to retire, having lost a quarter, or 2,000, of their force.

The Acehnese after two failed assaults, attempted to burn the ships in the dockyard by setting some vessels on fire but this failed as the Portuguese enabled their guns and fired the burning vessels sinking them, after this, the Portuguese held a council and in May 1524 they determined to abandon the fort as it was difficult to maintain such a station in a hostile land, in order to hide their intentions from the Acehnese, they ordered their artillery to be removed and packed in a form of merchandise and shipped off, a party was to set fire to the fort and most of it was burned, however, the Acehnese were aware of the evacuations, they hastily entered the fort, extinguished the fires and captured some pieces of artillery in which they used against the Portuguese, the retreat was ill conducted as the Acehnese bombarded them inflicting heavy casualties on the retreating Portuguese.

== Aftermath ==
As they retreated from the fort, they met 30 ships from the Aru Kingdom, whose king, with 4,000 men, was marching to Pasai inland. It was too late to help, so the Portuguese arrived in Malacca, where they found troops and ships ready to disembark for help. The unfortunate kings of Pedir and Daya took refuge in the kingdom of Aru.

== See also ==
- Pedir expedition (1522)
- Siege of Malacca (1568)
- Aceh expedition (1606)
- Battle of Aceh (1569)
- Acehnese invasion of Johor
- Acehnese conquest of Perak
- Battle of Aceh (1521)
