= Battle of Aceh =

Battle of Aceh may refer to:

- Battle of Aceh (1521)
- Battle of Aceh (1528)
- Battle of Aceh (1569)
- Battle of Aceh (1599)
