= Battle of Aceh (1528) =

Portuguese engagement in 16th century against Aceh Sultanate

- Part of Acehnese–Portuguese conflicts
Date	April 1528
Location	Aceh, Sumatra
Result	Acehnese victory

Belligerents
Portuguese Empire	(Aceh Sultanate) Sultanate of Aceh

Commanders and leaders
Simão de Sousa Galvão †	Ali Mughayat Syah

Strength
1 Galley; 70 men	20 Boats; 1,000 men

Casualties and losses
All but 2 killed	Heavy

The Battle of Aceh was a 1528 military engagement between a lone Portuguese galley and an Acehnese armada near the coast of Aceh, located in present-day Indonesia. The Acehnese captured the Portuguese galley.

== Context ==
In the early 16th century, Aceh rose from a vassal city into an independent kingdom, defeating the Portuguese and its allies in Aceh, Pedir, and Pasai. After the conquest of Pasai, neither side attempted major military expeditions.

However, in 1527, Francisco de Mello sailed in an armed vessel with dispatches to Goa. On his journey, he met a pilgrimage Acehnese ship coming from Mecca with a crew of three hundred Acehnese and forty Arabs. It was supposed to be a rich ship. They did not attempt to board it but bombarded and sank it from a distance, to their disappointment (losing their prize). The surviving crews attempted to swim, but the Portuguese massacred them, prompting the Acehnese to seek retaliation.

== Battle ==
In April 1528, Lopo Vaz de Sampaio, the Governor of Goa, appointed Simão de Sousa Galvão as the governor of Maluku Islands. He gave him command of a galley with seventy men. During his journey, he faced a violent storm and was forced to take shelter in Aceh but could not proceed any further due to headwinds.

The Acehnese Sultan, Ali Mughayat Syah, with a disdain for the Portuguese, wanted to capture the galley. He sent a message to Simão de Sousa recommending that he stand closer to the shore, where he would have better shelter from the galley and supply the ship with more provisions. This did not succeed, so he ordered the next morning one thousand men and 20 ships into action. Simão, aware of their hostility, fired against them. A fierce engagement ensued in which the Acehnese were repulsed with losses, but this came at the cost of forty Portuguese being killed.

The Sultan, disappointed by this setback, ordered a second attack, threatening to execute the admiral if he failed to capture it. A boat was sent ahead of the fleet with a signal of peace, informing him that the sultan would pay reparations to the Portuguese and punish the perpetrators and once again requesting him to come ashore.

Some of the crew wanted to accept the offer, but Simao preferred to die in combat rather than suffer humiliating submission. Both the Portuguese and Acehnese fought hard and bravely, and once again the Acehnese were repulsed. However, one of the Acehnese who boarded the ship and escaped later reported the dire situation the Portuguese were suffering. Encouraged by this report and knowing that fresh reinforcements had arrived, the Acehnese attacked for the third time and killed all of the crew, including Simao and his three brothers. Only two men survived and became prisoners.

== See also ==
- Siege of Malacca (1568)
- Aceh expedition (1606)
- Battle of Aceh (1569)
- Battle of Aceh (1521)
