= Battle of Aceh (1521) =

16th-century battle in Aceh

- Part of Acehnese–Portuguese conflicts
Date	June 1521
Location	Banda Aceh, Sumatra
Result	Acehnese victory

Belligerents
Portuguese Empire	(Aceh Sultanate) Sultanate of Aceh

Commanders and leaders
Jorge de Brito †	(Aceh Sultanate) Ali Mughayat Syah

Strength
200 men 6 ships	800–1,000 men 6 elephants

Casualties and losses
60 or 70 killed	3 or 4 cannons captured

The Battle of Aceh was a military engagement between the rising Sultanate of Aceh and the expeditionary Portuguese force in the northern Sumatran city of Aceh in which the Portuguese were defeated and their leader killed.

== Background ==
The Portuguese conquered Malacca in 1511. They were soon hated by Muslim traders who preferred to move to other port cities in the region, most importantly Aceh. The city was a strategic location at the northern tip of Sumatra, which gave it access to trade in the Indian Ocean area and the Red Sea, which would soon enter a fierce war with the Portuguese, Aceh being the most persistent of all Malayan enemies.

The conflicts between Aceh and Portugal started in 1519 when a Portuguese ship under Gaspar de Costa was lost near Aceh and attacked by the Acehnese, with its crew killed. Gaspar was captured and later ransomed, and it was not long after this that another ship under Joano de Lima was attacked near Aceh. All its crews were massacred, In 1520, the Acehnese captured the Portuguese settlement of Daya, These incidents enraged the Portuguese and prompted an attack on Aceh.

== Battle ==
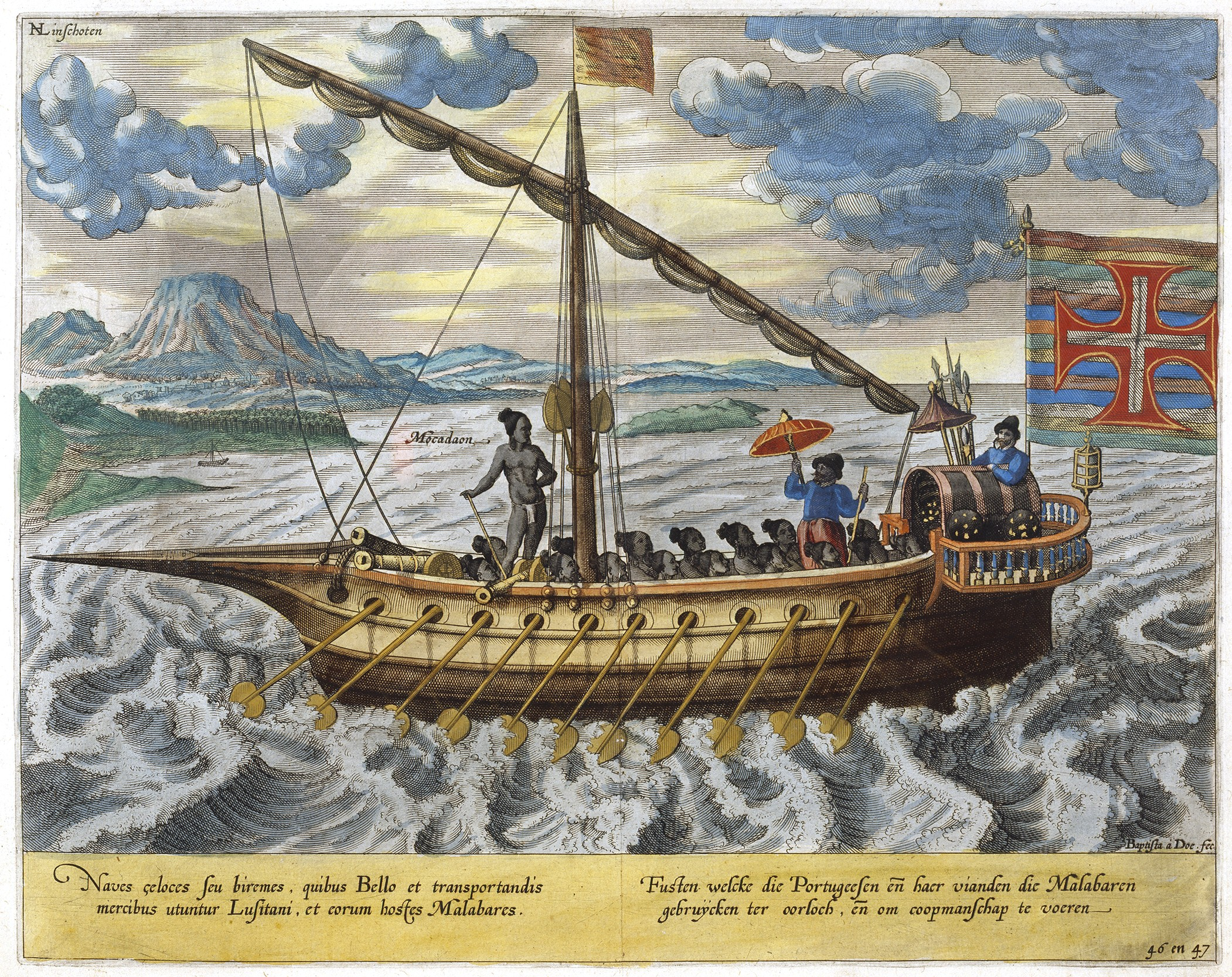
Portuguese Fusta

A Portuguese fleet consisting of 6 ships and 200 men was gathered and led by Jorge de Brito; the Portuguese left their base in India, Goa; they arrived in Sumatra in June, they found out about a shipwreck led by Joao de Borba alongside nine men; they were well received by the sultan of Aceh. He described the country to Jorge and told him about a great temple famous for its gold. Jorge then exchanged several messages with the Sultan, demanding him to retrieve the stolen goods. the Sultan told them that he knew of no more certain place to find these goods than at the bottom of the sea. Being swayed by his men, they made plans to defeat the Acehnese and sack its capital since it was a rich city. The Portuguese departed before dawn; halfway to their destination, they met a small coastal settlement on a spit of land projecting into the water with wooden fortifications protected by a few small cannons.

Jorge delayed attacking the settlement due to waiting for a Fusta ship led by Gaspar Gallo as it would defend the re-embarking Portuguese, as the winds pushing the ships into the river of the settlement, the Acehnese fired several shots, excited, the Portuguese men persuaded Jorge to attack, deciding not to wait for the Fusta, he embarked his men and drove the Acehnese from the settlement capturing 3 or 4 cannons, the Acehnese regrouped in other settlements downhill from the lost fort, the Portuguese led by Joao Serrao, the standard bearer charged down the hill against the Acehnese who succeeded in killing him, having seen the standard going ahead, the other Portuguese men rushed and joined the fierce battle.

At this moment the Sultan marched out of Aceh with an army of 800 to 1,000 alongside 6 elephants. Seeing the danger the elephants could damage, a man named Gaspar Fernandez attempted to wound an elephant, however, the elephant threw him high in the air, but this did not kill him, Jorge was then forced to ask one of his captains, Lourengo Godinho, to come forward with his musketeers and crossbowmen and to bring down the elephants that threatened his men which did not arrive, the Portuguese were then forced back to uphill where they made their stand, but the Acehnese threw burning sticks, arrows and spears at them, the Portuguese led a charge in which Jorge was wounded in the jaw by a spear, seeing how badly he was wounded, the captains begged him to withdraw back, a burning torch finished Jorge off and soon died.

The Portuguese troops suffered 60 or 70 killed, the Portuguese troops left much loot for the Acehnese, various Portuguese weaponry scattered on the battlefield in addition, the Acehnese also found a large bell called Cakra Donya which can be still seen today, the retreating Portuguese escaped to their fort in Pidie.

== Aftermath ==
The Acehnese chose to follow up with their victory, and in the next year, the Acehnese gathered 1,000 men and 15 elephants and marched into Pidie. The Acehnese captured the fort and defeated an expedition to save it led by Manuel Henriquez, which resulted in his death alongside 35 men, in 1524 they attacked Pasai fort with 15,000 men and forced its governor, Andre Henriquez, to surrender. The Acehnese victories in northern Sumatra established their supremacy and saved Sumatra from European Hegemony for several centuries and had the support of the Muslim traders from old trading centers of Pidie and Pasai.

== See also ==
- Pedir expedition (1522)
- Acehnese conquest of Pasai
- Battle of Aceh (1528)
- Siege of Malacca (1568)
- Aceh expedition (1606)
- Battle of Aceh (1569)
- Acehnese invasion of Johor
- Acehnese conquest of Perak
