= Pedir expedition (1522) =

Portuguese expedition to Pidir, 16th century

- Part of Acehnese–Portuguese conflicts
Date	May 1522
Location	Pedir, Sumatra
Result	Acehnese victory

Belligerents
Portuguese Empire	(Aceh Sultanate) Sultanate of Aceh

Commanders and leaders
Manuel Henriquez †	(Aceh Sultanate) Ali Mughayat Syah

Strength
280 men: 80 Portuguese	1,000 men 15 elephants

Casualties and losses
35 Portuguese killed	Unknown

The Pedir expedition was launched by the Portuguese in order to support the Sultanate of Pedir during the Acehnese invasion of the capital; the expedition ended in failure.

== Context ==
At the time when the Malayan city of Malacca fell to the Portuguese in 1511, Aceh was a vassal under the Sultanate of Pedir; the city was ruled by a slave. Those slaves usually were considered members of the ruling dynasty and were given privileges of owning profits and permission to reside in a certain city. The governor of Aceh had two sons, Raja Ibrahim, and Raja Lella, and when the governor got old, he abdicated to his elder son Raja Ibrahim who took the name "Ali Mughayat Syah",

A dispute rose between Raja Ibrahim and the Chief of Daya in Pedir, and as soon as Ibrahim took power, he resolved to use force against him. this strained relations between him and the Sultanate of Pedir, and his father reminded him of his duty and obligations to the sultan, in which the family was in debt to the dynasty. Ibrahim paid no heeds to his words and imprisoned his father. Ibrahim then declared war against Pedir. having captured several Portuguese ships and defeated a Portuguese expedition to the capital, Ibrahim was now prepared with his newly captured artillery.

== Expedition ==
In 1522, Ibrahim invaded the capital, and the Pedireese Sultan fled the capital alongside his family. Ibrahim captured the city by bribing high-ranking officers of the city, and due to the neglected defense of the city, Ibrahim, in order to capture its sultan, had some of the Pedireese officers write a deceiving letter to the sultan, informing him that they requested help from him to repulse the Acehnese attack and the city would fall if help did not arrive soon. The Pedireese Sultan then asked the governor of a Portuguese fortress in Pasai, Andre Henriquez, to lend him aid against the Acehnese.

Andre Henriquez, who arrived in Pasai in May 1522, organized an expedition of 280 men. 80 were Portuguese, and the rest were Malay auxiliaries. Andre saw this as an opportunity to chastise the Acehnese and appointed Lopez de Azevedo as the commander of the expedition, who was ready to depart soon. However, disputes rose between them, which led to Lopez abandoning the command of the brigade. Henriquez then went to appoint his brother Manuel as the commander of the expedition. The Portuguese went on by sea, while Ibrahim, with an army of 1000 men and 15 elephants, marched inland to defend the capital.

They arrived in Pedir late at night. They landed on the beach. However, they were secretly informed that the city had fallen to the Acehnese and that the help from the Pedireese was a trick. They aimed for their retreat; however, because of the low tides of water, and before the Portuguese could re-embark, they were ambushed by the Acehnese, who killed 35 Portuguese, including Manuel, and thus Pedir was secured.

== See also ==
- Siege of Malacca (1568)
- Aceh expedition (1606)
- Battle of Aceh (1569)
- Acehnese invasion of Johor
- Acehnese conquest of Perak
- Battle of Aceh (1521)
