= Siege of Malacca (1551) =

1551 siege of Portuguese Malacca

Siege of Malacca 1551
- Part of Malay–Portuguese conflicts
- Portugues defense of Malacca, 1900 depiction.
Date	June–September 1551
Location	Malacca, Malay Peninsula
Result	Portuguese victory

Belligerents
Portuguese Empire	Sultanate of Johor; Sultanate of Jepara; Sultanate of Perak; Sultanate of Pahang

Commanders and leaders
Dom Pedro da Silva; Dom Garcia de Meneses †	Alauddin Riayat Shah II of Johor; Laksamana †; Zainal Abidin Shah of Pahang; Mansur Shah I of Perak; Ratu Kalinyamat of Jepara

Strength
400 Portuguese soldiers Malay auxiliaries	150 Malay lancharas 6,000 Malays; 40 Javanese junks 4,000 Javanese

Casualties and losses
Over 200 dead among soldiers and civilians	Over 2,000 dead

The siege of Malacca of 1551 was a military engagement that took place in the Malay Peninsula, between the Portuguese Empire and the allied forces of the Sultanate of Johor, the Sultanate of Pahang, the Sultanate of Perak and the Sultanate of Jepara in Java. The Portuguese were victorious.

== Context ==
In 1536, the Sultanate of Johor signed a peace treaty with Portugal after the captain of Malacca Dom Estevão da Gama razed Johor. By 1551 however, the Sultan of Johor Alauddin Riayat Shah II disregarded the peace treaty and without provocation forged a coalition with the Sultan of Pahang, the Sultan of Perak and the queen of Jepara in Java to attack Portuguese Malacca.

== The siege ==
In late June 1551, the Malay-Javanese fleet of 150 Malay lancharas, 6,000 Malay warriors, 40 Javanese junks and 4,000 Javanese warriors anchored by the coast of Sumatra in front of Cape Rachado and dispatched an ambassador to Malacca to try and convince the captain of the city Dom Pedro da Silva that they were passing by to attack the Sultanate of Aceh and to send him as many soldiers as he could to help. Suspecting a ruse, Dom Pedro instead dispatched vessels to the region to warn of the presence of the armada, recall all Portuguese soldiers away from the city, and bring back supplies, while ordering the garrison to prepare for an attack.

Realizing the ruse had failed, the Javanese landed and attacked the villages in the vicinity of the city, while the Malays attacked the Malacca harbour. The Malays landed and began building siege-works, barricades and assembling artillery.

A few days later, 40 Malay lancharas fought against a heavily armed Portuguese square-rigged caravel commanded by Dom Garcia de Meneses, that was passing on its way to the Moluccas. The Malays were unable to grapple the fast caravel, while a shot from a Portuguese cannon killed an experienced Johor admiral, who had fought the Portuguese for decades. Demoralized, the Malays withdrew to land, while Dom Garcia anchored close to the fortress. Dom Garcia was later killed with 30 men during an attack onshore.

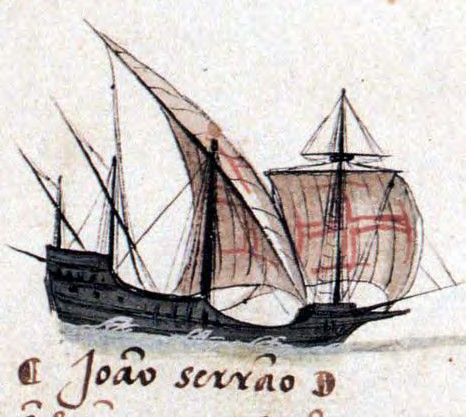
Portuguese square-rigged caravel

The Malays attempted to blockade Malacca and cut-off its naval supply lines, attacking any arriving Portuguese ship, unsuccessfully. On 12 August the Malays and Javanese attempted to scale the walls of Malacca in a mass attack, however the Portuguese, among whom there were a number of veterans from the Italian Wars, successfully repulsed the assault, through the use of gunfire, gunpowder grenades and the dropping of disassembled masts and long timber beams, killing 600–800.

The attackers were compelled to try and starve the Portuguese out. As supplies ran low and the Portuguese became desperate, Dom Pedro publicly ordered a number of captains to attack the coastal cities of Johor, Pahang and Perak. Rumour having spread of Portuguese preparations, the Malay sultans withdrew with their forces as soon as they witnessed Portuguese ships leave the harbour, leaving behind the Javanese, who continued the siege.

A few days later, a ship arrived in Malacca with further reinforcements. The Portuguese conducted a sally against the Javanese with 200–300 soldiers and caught the Javanese unprepared, throwing them into disarray, killing a large number while they attempted to reembark. The Javanese withdrew the following day.

== Aftermath ==
The Portuguese captured a large amount of spoils left behind by the besiegers. Most of the Portuguese casualties came from the water wells poisoned by the Malays and Javanese. A brother of the Portuguese traveller Fernão Mendes Pinto, Álvaro, participated in the siege. The missionary Francis Xavier disembarked in Malacca a few months later in December and was well received by Dom Pedro da Silva.

The Portuguese navy officer Saturnino Monteiro pointed out the fact that "the simple threat of action from our armada against the shores of their kingdoms was enough to force the Malay kings to lift the siege, which constitutes another flagrant example of the flexibility of sea-power."

== See also ==
- Portuguese conquest of Malacca
- Acehnese–Portuguese conflicts
