= Acehnese invasion of Kedah =

Part of the Acehnese-Portuguese conflicts

- Part of Acehnese–Portuguese conflicts and Malay-Acehnese conflicts
Date	1619
Location	Kedah, Malaysia
Result	Acehnese victory
Territorial changes	Kedah becomes vassal of Aceh Sultanate

Belligerents
(Aceh Sultanate) Sultanate of Aceh	Kedah Sultanate; Patani Kingdom

Commanders and leaders
(Aceh Sultanate) Iskandar Muda	(Kedah) Sulaiman Shah II (surrendered); Raja Biru

Strength
50 Galleys	Unknown Kedah garrison 2,000 Patani warriors

Casualties and losses
Unknown	7,000 captured

The invasion of Kedah in 1619 was launched by Aceh Sultanate to destroy the rival pepper port of Kedah. The Acehnese were victorious, and Kedah became a vassal of the Aceh sultanate.

== Context ==
Kedah was a popular pepper port that was often traded by the Portuguese in the fort. The Acehnese sultan, Iskandar Muda, was determined to destroy the port; his determination to destroy the Portuguese hegemony grew year after year, and with the trade incomes, he managed to enlarge his navy alongside the victories he made on other ports such as Johor and Pahang.

The Kedahnese Sultan, Sulaiman Shah II, built a fort called Kuala Kedah with the assistance of the Portuguese. The rectangular-shaped fort served as a trading factory by the Portuguese rather than a military outpost, which certainly became a target for the Acehnese.

== Invasion ==
With an armada of 50 Galleys, the Acehnese attacked Kedah, destroyed the Kota Kuala fort, and began cutting down all the pepper vines, killing the cattle, and ravaging everything in their way. Kedah was no longer available for pepper production. A neighbouring kingdom, the Patani Kingdom, sent a force 2,000 to assist Kedah against Aceh. The Acehnese then laid siege to Kedah for three months, The Kedahnese sultan and his family hid behind the city and surrendered to the Acehnese after being convinced that Iskandar Muda would not hurt the sultan because he admired his great stamina and the manner in which he controlled his dependencies. Suliaman had no choice as he lacked water and was badly injured. The crown prince who advised his father against surrendering, was able to flee and evade the Acehnese. The Acehnese destroyed all the fruit trees, killed the surviving cattle, burnt the city, and took 7,000 prisoners to Aceh. The Acehnese made sure that pepper was no longer available to foreigners. Out of 7,000 captives, only 500 survived, as they were deprived of food and necessities.

== See also ==
- Acehnese invasion of Johor
- Acehnese conquest of Perak
