= Battle of Aceh (1569) =

Portuguese naval victory off Sumatra

- Part of Acehnese–Portuguese conflicts
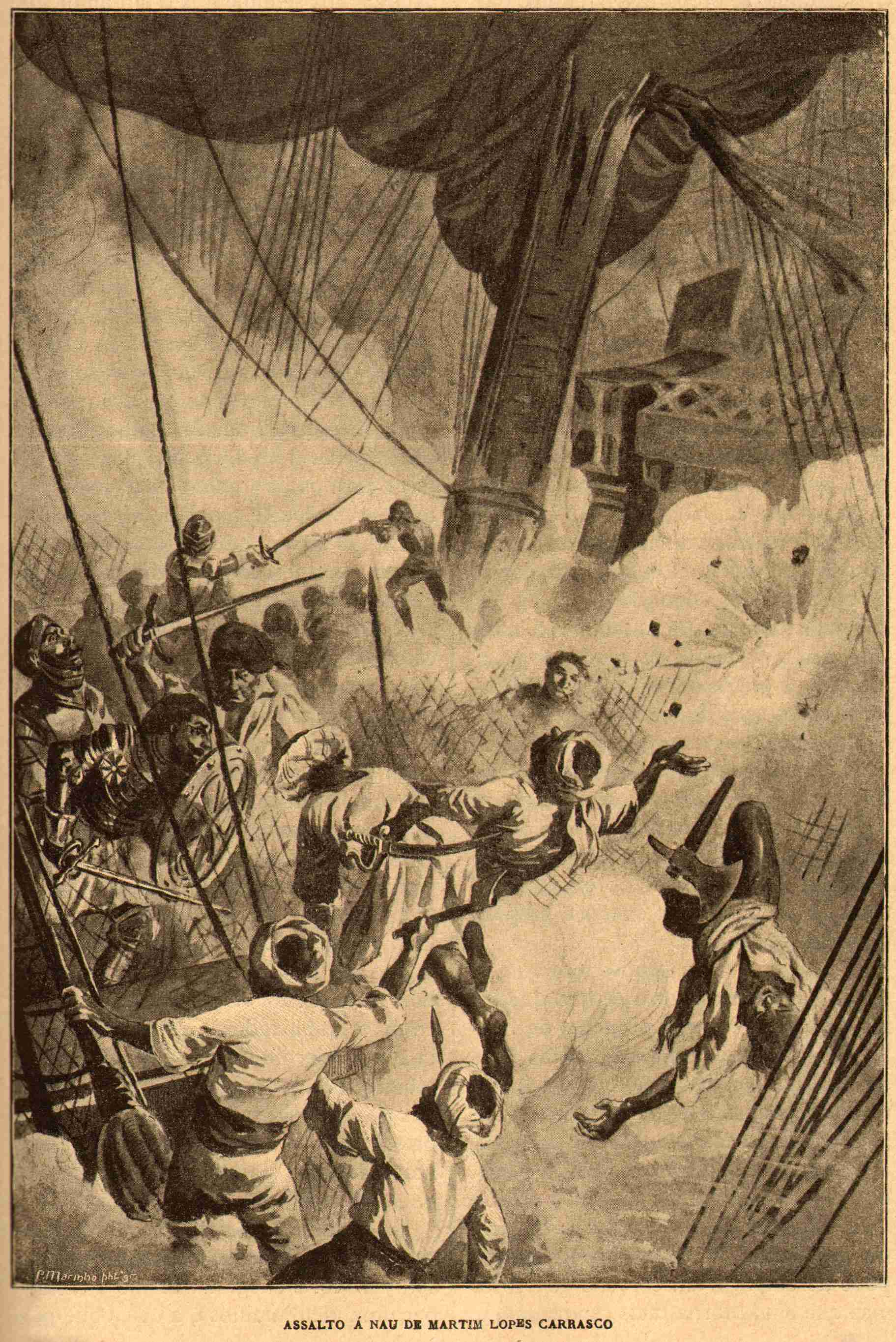
- 19th century Portuguese illustration of the Battle of Aceh.
Date	May 1569
Location	Northwestern coast of Sumatra
Result	Portuguese victory

Belligerents
Portugal	(Aceh Sultanate) Sultanate of Aceh

Commanders and leaders
Mem Lopes Carrasco	Unknown

Strength
1 carrack	20 galleys; 20 war junks; 200 smaller craft

Casualties and losses
Many dead and wounded	Several ships

The Battle of Aceh was fought in 1569 off the coast of Sumatra between a lone Portuguese carrack (nau, in Portuguese) and an armada of the Sultanate of Aceh, that was about to stage an attack on Portuguese Malacca. It ended in Portuguese victory and the withdrawal of the Aceh fleet after suffering heavy losses.

== Background ==
In the beginning of May 1569, a privately owned carrack, escorted by a heavily armed galleon, departed from Goa, bound for south-east Asia. The captain and owner of the carrack was a wealthy man called Mem Lopes Carrasco, while the captain of the galleon was João Gago de Andrade, tasked with resupplying and reinforcing the Portuguese garrison in the fortress of Ternate in the Moluccas. Carrasco intended to sail his ship to the Sunda Strait, possibly to buy high-quality pepper and sandalwood, among other highly valuable products made in the region. After passing by the Cape Comorin in the southernmost tip of India and the threat of pirates lessened, the carrack left the galleon's protection and sailed at full speed away from its sight. Upon passing by northwestern Sumatra where the Sultanate of Aceh was located, the wind suddenly dropped, leaving the carrack moving at a very slow pace. Aceh was a staunch enemy of the Portuguese, and frequently harassed the shipping of Malacca and was at that time outfitting an armada with which to attack the city. It was composed of 20 galleys, 20 war junks, and over 200 craft of smaller dimension. The Ottoman Empire had sent boats and a naval fleet to show support to the Sultanate of Aceh, to again try to stage an attack on Portuguese-occupied Malacca, but was ultimately unsuccessful.

== Battle ==
Upon sighting the lone carrack, the fleet immediately sailed forth out of the harbour of Aceh in the carrack's pursuit. According to the 16th century Portuguese historian Diogo do Couto:

Just as Mem Lopes Carrasco sighted the armada, of which he could not hope to evade (for lack of wind), he prepared to resist it, for he knew well that it was necessary for everyone's salvation, for he could not hope to parlay with such an enemy as they spare not the life of any Portuguese they capture on account of their great hatred towards them. Thus, he ordered the sails to be furled, barrels to be filled up with water (to take out the fires) and the artillery to be readied, of which he carried seven or eight pieces ...; and the people he had with him, about forty men, distributed among the most dangerous posts: on the forecastle his son, Martim Lopes Carrasco with ten men; and in the aft-castle, Francisco da Costa with another ten soldiers; and one Martim Daço, cousin of Mem Lopes Carrasco he tasked with overseeing the artillery; himself he stayed on the main deck with the remaining men, and with them Father Francisco Cabral of the Jesuits, and a Franciscan friar, both with a Crucifix in their hands rallying the men to hold fast against such an armada, which had already surrounded the nau, and began bombarding it with great terror and bravery, tearing its cables, opening many holes with the cannonballs that threw the ship adrift; but our own did their part valorously, bringing much destruction upon them with our artillery, killing many people, as the sea was covered in ships our cannonballs had nowhere to hit but them.

The battle lasted all day, until the armada retreated by nightfall and dropped anchor in sight of the carrack. The Portuguese took the opportunity to take care of their wounded and make repairs on the ship all throughout the night. By the following morning, the battle resumed, as the armada sailed to board the carrack:

By the following day at dawn, again the Armada surrounded the nau, bombarding it and bringing great destruction upon it with great fury; but our own responded suit, achieving great acts of chivalry: So much did the enemies oppress the carrack, that three powerful galleys grappled the ship, while both the Fathers engaged the fight amidst the men, carrying their Crucifixes high and exorting our own to fight for the Faith of Christ ...; so much did they exorted the valor and fury of our own, that they threw all the enemies to the sea, and with such impetus Martim Daço boarded a galley, carrying a sword and a buckler shield, causing great damage while assisted by the musketry from above; and as Mem Lopes Carrasco ordered him to return, he replied that he would not until the galley surrendered, in response to the Moors having captured the ship's dinghy. As the galley was assisted by others, Martim Daço was forced to retreat with serious wounds. Mem Lopes, Captain and Lord of the nau spent all time dedicated to the fight, so blackened by gunpowder and his own blood was he that he was unrecognizable if not for his weapons and armour; and as he fought throughout all the ship, where our own fought bravely, he was shot in the leg, and immediately he was thought to have been killed: in the forecastle, where his son Martim Lopes Carrasco had done wonders in its defence, he was informed by a soldier that his father was dead, to which he replied: "If it's true, then one man alone is dead, and many more remain to defend the ship". As the wound was not lethal, and Mem Lopes managed to walk, he proceeded with his doing with much valor, followed always by Father Francisco Cabral of the Company who brought great cheer and prudence to all ... Father Francisco was at all times with the Crucifix in hand, invoking Santiago and raising the spirits with valorous words; ... and for three days our own were battered by the armada until the ships' castles and masts were torn down, and most people dead and the remaining wounded, until at the end of those three days they retreated, upon sighting the galleon of João Gago de Andrade.

== Aftermath ==
The armada of Aceh retreated with forty fewer ships "and the remaining so severely damaged" that the Acehnese called off the attack on Malacca at that time.

João Gago provided Mem Lopes Carrasco with the materials to build improvised masts so they could proceed to Malacca. He then left the carrack behind, possibly outraged that Carrasco had left him after passing the Cape Comorin. Upon arriving in Malacca however, the Captain of the fortress ordered Gago to immediately sail back and escort them the rest of the away, whereupon the surviving passengers were given a triumphant reception in the city. The carrack was so damaged that Mem Lopes Carrasco gave up on his plans to proceed to the Sunda strait and returned to India as quickly as possible. Upon hearing of Carrasco's feat in Lisbon, King Sebastian of Portugal awarded him the title of nobleman and membership in the Order of Christ, along with a generous yearly sum of money.

The Sultan of Aceh in the meantime was so affronted by such a humiliating defeat that according to Couto, he "took his vengeance on his own men, which he couldn't on the Portuguese".

== See also ==
- Battle of Aceh (1521)
- Siege of Malacca (1568)
- Aceh expedition (1606)
- Acehnese invasion of Johor
- Acehnese conquest of Perak
