= Battle of Formoso River =

Naval battle between Aceh and Portugal (1615)

- Part of Acehnese–Portuguese conflicts
Date	27 November – 2 December 1615
Location	Formoso River
Result	Portuguese victory

Belligerents
Portuguese Empire	Aceh Sultanate

Commanders and leaders
Francisco de Miranda Henriques; Diogo de Mendonça Furtado	Iskandar Muda

Strength
4 galleons 6 half-galleys 10 jáleas	300 – 500 vessels: 100 galleys; 150 ghurabs.; 250 junks, lancharas, calaluzes.; 30,000, 40,000 or 60,000 men

Casualties and losses
1 galleon, 1 half-galley, 100 dead, 30 POWs.	20,000 men, 200 POWs.

The Battle of Formoso River of 1615 was a naval battle that took place in the Malay Peninsula in the Formoso River, between a Portuguese fleet and a large fleet of the Sultanate of Aceh, one of the largest Aceh had ever mobilized against the Portuguese in Malacca.

In what was "one of the bloodiest battles the Portuguese fought in south-east Asia", the Acehnese suffered so much damage they were forced to call off their plans to attack Malacca and returned to Aceh.

== Background ==
In 1613, the Sultan of Aceh Iskandar Muda undertook a campaign against the Sultanate of Johor, and succeeded in installing a pro-Aceh sultan on the throne, Abdullah Ma'ayat Shah. Iskandar Muda instructed Sultan Abdullah to prepare a large fleet to jointly attack Portuguese Malacca.

Having learned of the plan, the Portuguese captain of Malacca sent an embassy to Johor headed by a distinguished fidalgo who convinced the Sultan of Johor to end his alliance Aceh, expel the Acehnese dignitaries on Johor and sign a treaty with Portugal instead. As a result of this, in 1615, Iskandar Muda led a second successful campaign against Johor with a large fleet of 100 galleys, 150 ghurab, 250 junks, lancharas, calaluzes and 40,000 men. Sultan Abdullah fled to Bintan Island. On the way back, Sultan Muda intended to conduct a surprise attack against Portuguese Malacca. He anchored his fleet in the Formoso River. It was the largest fleet the Acehnese had ever mobilized for an attack against Malacca.

On November 27, 1615, the Acehnese were detected by a fleet under the command of captain-major Diogo de Mendonça Furtado, who had left Malacca with six half-galleys and 10 light oarships to patrol the Singapore Strait and verify reports that a large Acehnese fleet was approaching. Upon reaching the Formoso River, Furtado realized the magnitude of the threat, and dispatched a vessel to warn Malacca. As a result, the captain of the city dispatched Francisco de Miranda with 4 galleons to support Furtado.

== Battle ==
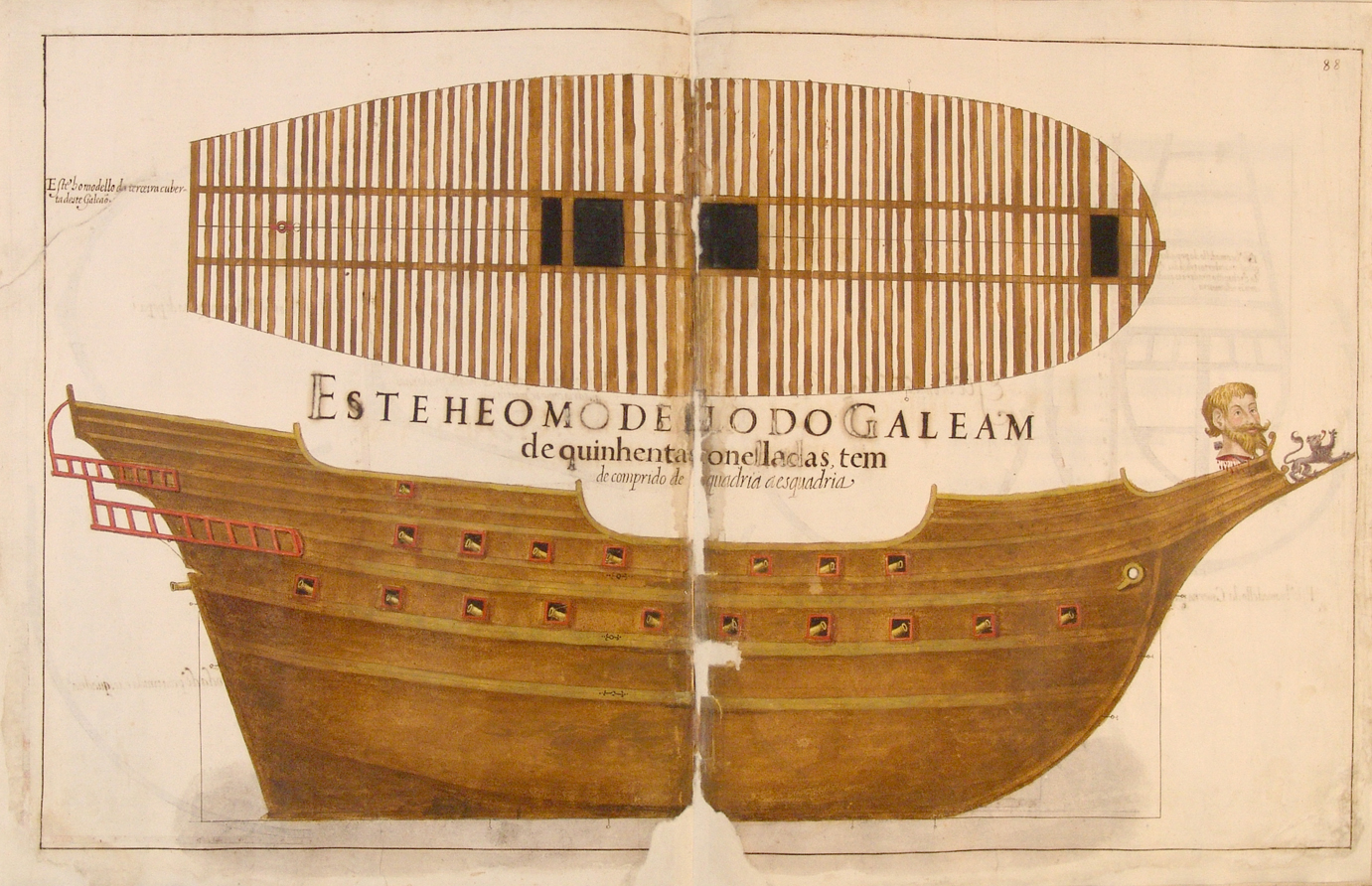
1616 Portuguese technical drawing of a galleon.

Come night, Diogo Mendonça Furtado sailed his light oar-vessels into the midst of the Acehnese fleet under cover of the darkness to scout it and conduct a surprise attack. Opening fire, the Acehnese were caught by surprise and thrown into disarray, chaos and confusion set in and the Acehnese inflicted casualties among each other.

Francisco de Miranda joined Furtado with 4 galleons in reinforcement on the morning of December 1. By noon they engaged the Acehnese with their artillery. Due to their large numbers, Portuguese artillery caused great damage to the compact Acehnese fleet. By evening, a storm scattered the fleet, and visual contact between the two fleets was lost as the Portuguese headed north and the Acehnese south. By midday of the following day, the Acehnese returned to the mouth of the Formoso River and found the Portuguese galleons becalmed, therefore vulnerable, and separated into two groups due to a lack of wind. Furtado transferred all his soldiers to the galleons in expectation of the fight to come and withdrew to a safe distance with this empty vessels. The Acehnese admiral realized the vulnerability of the Portuguese galleons, and convinced the sultan to try and board them en masse.

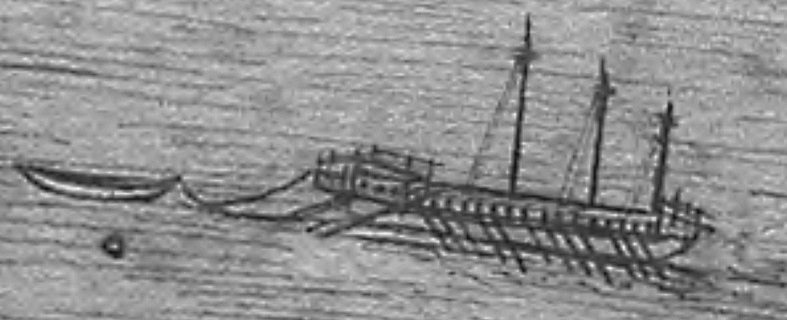
Three-masted Acehnese galley depicted by the Portuguese.

Captain Dom João da Silveira ordered the lower gun-ports of his galleon closed, fearing that the Acehnese might climb into his ship through them, thereby preventing his heavy guns from being used. The Acehnese managed to close in and set fire to his ship from the stern sector; many Portuguese jumped overboard, to be cut down by the Acehnese, whilst 30 were taken prisoner.

The Acehnese tried to tow the burning galleon towards the flagship of Henriques, but Portuguese heavy artillery prevented the maneuvre. The flagship of Francisco de Miranda Henriques, the São Bento was set on fire eighteen times, grappled fourteen times, boarded three times but the Acehnese were repulsed each time. The battle lasted from 4 pm to 11 pm, when wind began to pick up, allowing the two remaining Portuguese galleon to sail to the aid the flagship. With mounting losses, having come under heavy fire, and threatened by the galleons, Sultan Iskandar Muda ordered a retreat.

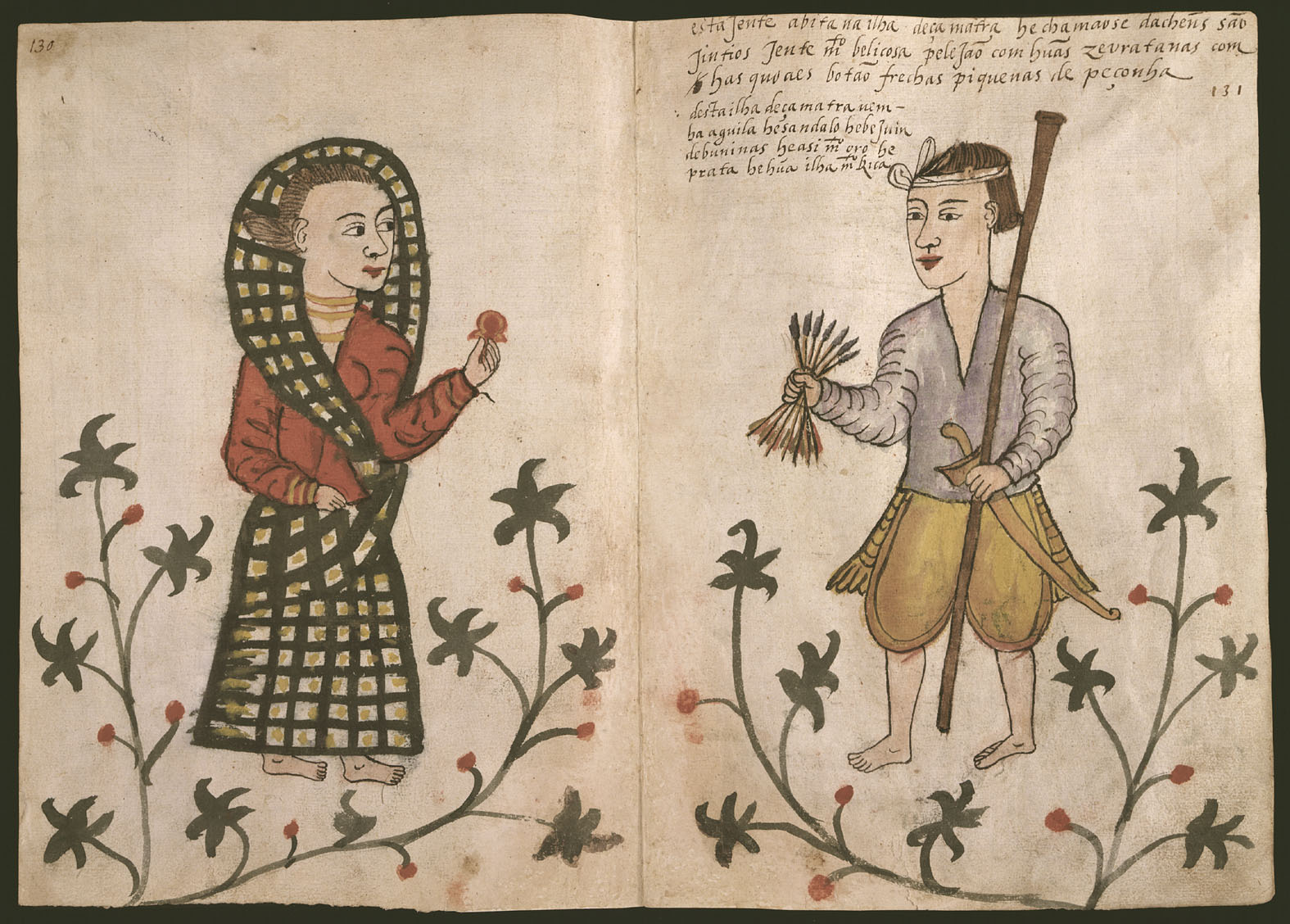
Portuguese depiction of an Acehnese warrior with a blow-gun, a kris and his wife, in the Códice Casanatense.

== Aftermath ==
The Portuguese estimated to have inflicted several thousands of casualties on the Acehnese fleet among warriors and sailors. The Portuguese lost one galleon, one half-galley, about 100 dead, most of them Indian auxiliaries, and 30 prisoners of war. As a result of the damage suffered, the Acehnese were forced to abandon their plans to siege Malacca, and left for Aceh.

Francisco de Miranda Henriques and his men were given a heroes reception upon returning to Malacca.

Diogo de Mendonça Furtado followed the Acehnese fleet to the island of Bengkalis, where he ambushed an Acehnese force that was taking in water and captured 200 men. Fearing that the Portuguese might set upon him, Iskandar Muda wrote to the captain of Malacca offering to release all prisoners. When the Portuguese were about to catch up the Acehnese fleet, they were warned that a Dutch fleet had been spotted in the Singapore Strait, causing the pursuit to be abandoned, allowing the Acehnese to return home.

== See also ==
- Portuguese Malacca
- Battle of Duyon River
