= Aceh expedition (1606) =

17th c. Portuguese military action

- Part of Acehnese-Portuguese conflicts
Date	June 1606
Location	Banda Aceh, Sumatra
Result	Acehnese victory

Belligerents
Portuguese Empire	(Aceh Sultanate) Sultanate of Aceh

Commanders and leaders
Martim Afonso de Castro	(Aceh Sultanate) Iskandar Muda

Strength
3,000 men 15 or 16 full-rigged ships 2 Carracks; 1 Caravel; 4 Galleys; 23 Fustas and Galliots	Unknown

Casualties and losses
200 or 300 killed	2 cannons captured

The Aceh Expedition was a military expedition launched by the Portuguese against the Acehnese to force them to build a Portuguese fortress near Aceh. However, the expedition ended in failure.

== Background ==
Since the rise of the Aceh Sultanate, the Acehnese entered with the Portuguese a long series of conflicts to dominate the Straits of Malacca. In 1568, the Acehnese, backed by the Ottomans, besieged Malacca but to no avail. Between 1570 and 1575, they came close to capturing Malacca but failed.

The nature of the conflict changed when the new Portuguese enemy arrived. The Dutch sought to establish their own empire, entering a long conflict with the Portuguese. In 1600 the Dutch were welcomed by the Acehnese who sought allies against the Portuguese, which made relations with Portuguese strained and sought to punish them for breaking a pact between them before, but the Portuguese also wanted to erect a fort near Aceh, as demonstrated by Philip's letter to Martim Afonso de Castro:

And because, according to what has been clear for a long time here about how important it is to build a fortress in Aceh, as well as because, since you are in those lands, you will better understand the need for this, I am certain that you will execute this accordingly. However, I must once again order and entrust you [to take care] of the quality of the materials, as I am doing [now]. You must build the said fortress no matter what.

== Expedition ==
In May 1606, the Portuguese fleet left Goa with a ship of 15 or 16 full-rigged ships; they were joined by two carracks, followed by a caravel, four galleys, and 23 fustas and galliots. The armada carried 3,000 soldiers. They arrived in June and spotted three Acehnese cargo ships sailing; they were captured, Dom Martim then dispatched an envoy to Aceh, demanding that its sultan allow them to establish a fortress. The Acehnese were interested in negotiations but this proved to be a trick, as the Acehnese extended the negotiations in order to prepare for the upcoming attack and strengthen their resistance inland, which caused delays in embarking.

After the negotiations ended, the Acehnese bombarded the armada, and in response, Dom Martim launched an amphibious assault and captured a fortress on the coast, capturing 2 cannons, and then marched to capture the second one. Alarmed by their success, the Acehnese prince Iskandar Muda, who was imprisoned at that time after losing a civil war with his father, Ali Ri'ayat Syah III, begged his father to release him and allow him to lead the Acehnese army, which he accepted. under the prince, the Acehnese succeeded in halting the Portuguese attack with two or three attacks, and the fighting had lasted for two days. Having gained no advantage against Aceh, Dom Martin ordered a withdrawal upon learning of a combined Dutch-Johorese attack on Malacca. Despite capturing a fortress, the entire expedition caused 200 or 300 of their "best men" to be killed.

== See also ==
- Siege of Malacca (1568)
- Battle of Aceh (1521)
- Battle of Aceh (1569)
- Pedir expedition (1522)
- Acehnese conquest of Pasai
- Battle of Aceh (1528)
