= Acehnese conquest of Perak =

1620 conflict

Date	July 1620
Location	Perak, Malaysia
Result	Acehnese victory

Belligerents
(Aceh Sultanate) Sultanate of Aceh; Supported by : Dutch East India Company	Sultanate of Perak

Commanders and leaders
(Aceh Sultanate) Iskandar Muda	Mukaddam Shah of Perak (POW)

Strength
Unknown	Unknown

Casualties and losses
Unknown	5,000 captured

The Conquest of Perak was a military invasion launched by the Acehnese Sultanate to capture the port of Perak from its Sultan Mukaddam Shah of Perak, the attack was successful and its sultan was captured.

== Background ==
Perak was a Malayan port famous for its tin trade, which gave a reason for Iskandar Muda to invade the port, in 1613, according to Thomas Best, the Acehnese confiscated a ship from Surat because it had been in Perak since both Sultanates were enemies at that time, Perak was crucial for Aceh's development, in the middle of 16th century, the Acehnese built a fort there to protect its trade from Malabar Coast against Portuguese attacks, the Acehnese invaded Perak and captured its sultan Mansur Shah I of Perak alongside his family.

According to traditional accounts, Sultan Makaddam Shah had a beautiful princess named Puteri Limau Purut, he betrothed the princess to his nephew named Raja Mansur, who is the younger brother of Sultan Alauddin Shah (the fifth Sultan of Perak). the sultan rejected a proposal from Iskandar Muda to marry her, Considering the rejection, the Sultan of Acheh ordered his army to fight with the kingdom of Perak.

== Conquest ==
Jacques Coetelij of the VOC, who visited Aceh, reported that on 1 July 1620, the Acehnese launched their armada against the sultan of Perak, almost all of Iskandar Muda's Galleys, The Acehnese army defeated and captured Sultan Mukaddam Shah, alongside his queen, his younger brother named Raja Yusuf, Princess Limau Purut and her Grandmother named Esah Gerbang and some of his entourage, relatives, and companions were then taken to Aceh.

== Aftermath ==
The Acehnese captured 5000 prisoners. Now Iskandar Muda successfully controlled the trade of tin.

After the invasion, the Acehnese detached 20 ships that sailed to the vicinity of Portuguese Malacca but were detected by the Portuguese and so they sailed away. The presence of 4 large warships in Malacca demonstrated that the Portuguese were ready to defend their interests in the region against Aceh, Iskander Muda asked the Dutch for assistance against those ships in return for extension of the Contract in Tiku.

Having gotten information of Aceh activity in Perak, the captain of Malacca dispatched 9 oar vessels under the command of Fernão da Costa to the vicinity of Perak, so as to scout the Acehnese armada and escort a number of Portuguese merchant ships that were expected to arrive. Fernão da Costa attacked a number of Acehnese ships within the river, and then withdrew.

The attack on Perak had worried the Portuguese, according to a Dutch merchant, Adriaen van der Dussen reported on 27 December that Malacca was busy fortifying its base, The Portuguese asked the Johorese sultan Abdullah Ma'ayat Shah to sell them 10 pieces of artillery but Abdullah told them that his artillery was not for sale, even if they paid in gold.

Aceh control of Perak was short. After the disastrous Battle of Duyon River, in which the Portuguese completely wiped out a large Acehnese armada, Perak defected to the side of Portugal.

== See also ==
- Siege of Malacca (1568)
- Aceh expedition (1606)
- Acehnese invasion of Johor
- Acehnese invasion of Kedah
