= Siege of Malacca (1568) =

Offensive by the Sultanate of Aceh

Coordinates: 2.1888°N 102.2511°E

- Part of the Acehnese–Portuguese conflicts, the Ottoman–Portuguese confrontations, the Malay–Portuguese conflicts and Malay-Acehnese conflicts
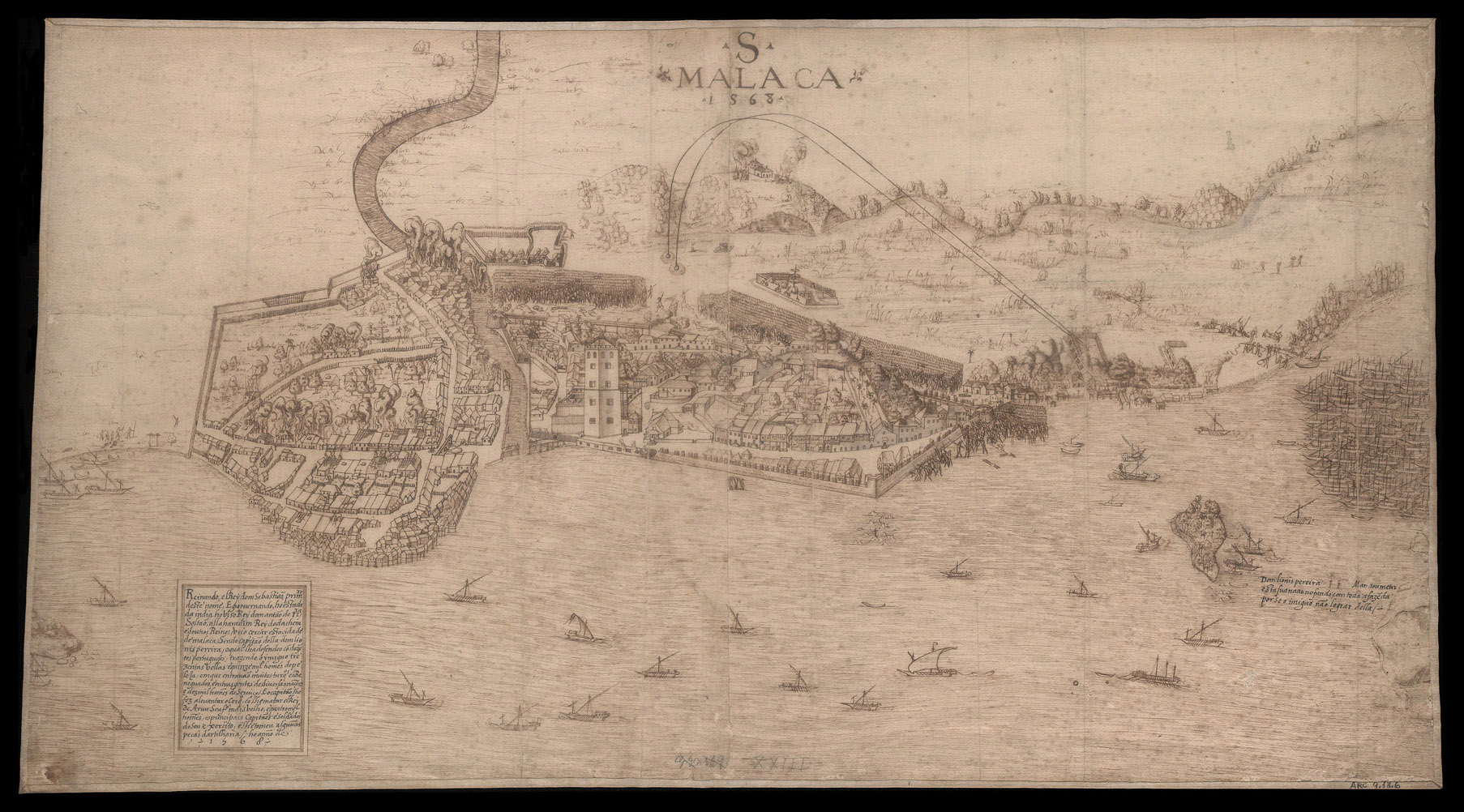
- Portuguese map of the city of Malacca besieged in 1568
Date	1568
Location	Malacca
Result	Portuguese–Johorean victory

Belligerents
Portuguese Empire; Sultanate of Johor	(Aceh Sultanate) Aceh Sultanate; Kalinyamat Kingdom; Ottoman Empire

Commanders and leaders
Leonis Pereira; Muzaffar II of Johor	Alauddin al-Kahar; Ratu Kalinyamat

Strength
1,500 men	15,000 men 400 Ottoman gunners 300 ships 200 cannons

Casualties and losses
3 dead	4,000 dead Several more wounded

The siege of Malacca occurred in 1568, when the Sultan of Aceh Alauddin attacked the Portuguese-held city of Malacca. The city had been held by the Portuguese since its capture by Afonso de Albuquerque in 1511.

The offensive was the result of a pan-Islamic alliance to try to repel the Portuguese from Malacca and the coasts of India. The Ottoman Empire supplied cannoneers to the alliance, but were unable to provide more due to the ongoing invasion of Cyprus and an uprising in Aden.

The army of the Sultan was composed of a large fleet of long galley-type oared ships, 15,000 troops, and Ottoman mercenaries. The city of Malacca was successfully defended by Dom Leonis Pereira, who was supported by the king of Johore. Pereira led 1,500 men while only 200 were Portuguese, some of the rest included Malays. The Acehnese led a heavy discharge of cannons and brought 200 ladders to scale the city walls but was hurled down by the defenders. Eventually, Portuguese forces sallied on the Acehnese defensive earthworks and killed a great number, capturing scimitars, muskets and a cannon. Not able to take the town after three days, Alauddin sailed back, burning some of his own ships as many of his men had died.

Other attacks on Malacca by the Acehnese would continue during the following years, especially in 1570. The offensive weakened the Portuguese Empire but they still managed to stage attacks far away from Malacca, such as in the 1570s, when the Sultan of the Moluccas repelled the Portuguese from the Spice Islands.
