= Inderapura Kingdom =

Old vassal kingdom of Pagaruyung

Ujung Pagaruyung Inderapura
- 1347–1792
- Marawa Minangkabau Royal seal of Sultan Muhammad Syah

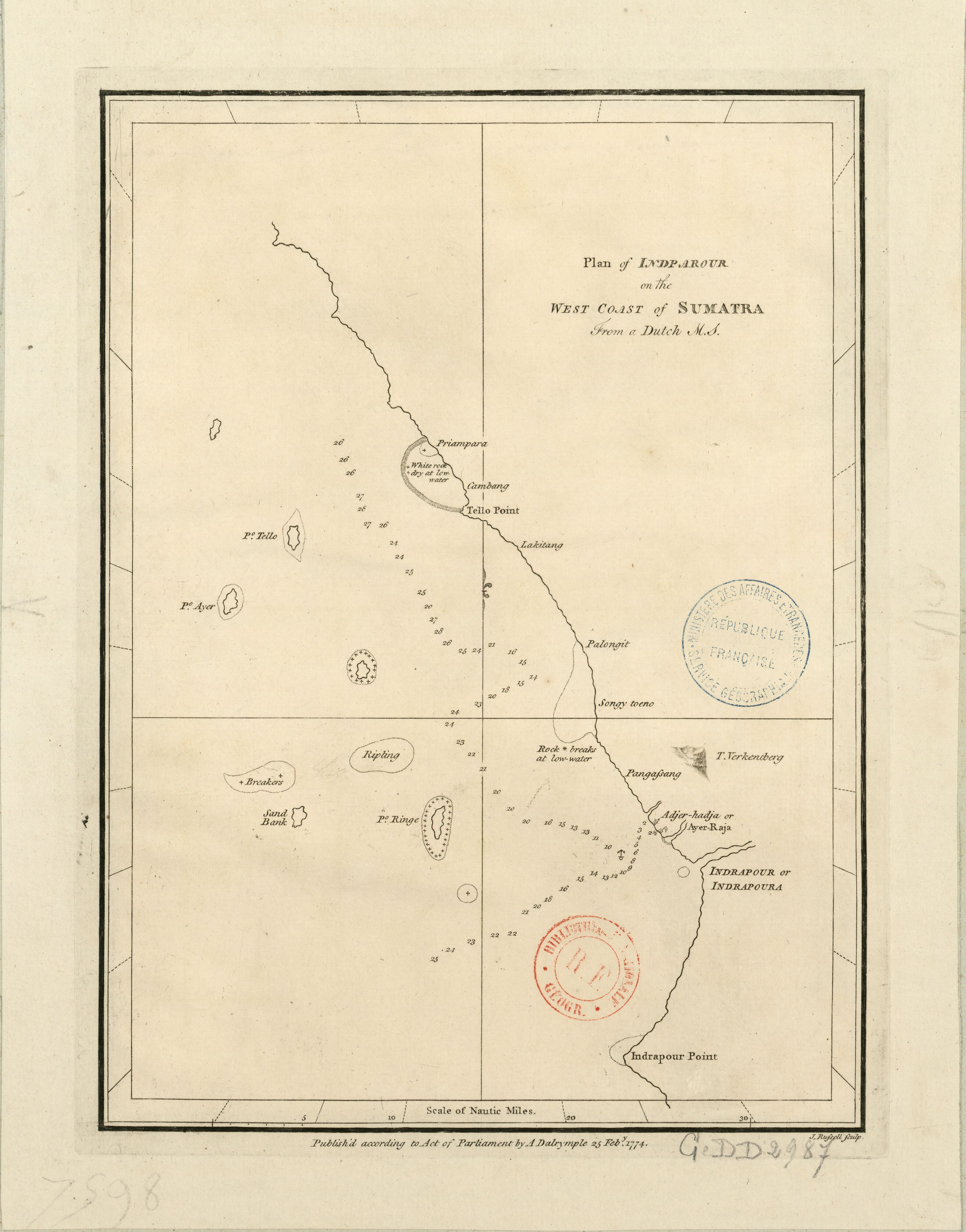
- Map of Inderapour in 1774, Inderapura can be seen on the bottom right of the map.
- Capital: Nagari Inderapura
- Common languages: Minang, Malay, and Sanskrit,
- Religion: Hindu-Buddhism (first era), Animism, Sunni Islam (last era)
- Government: Monarchy
- History
  - Established: 1347
  - Collapse: 1792
Preceded by	Succeeded by
Dharmasraya; Pagaruyung Kingdom	Dutch East India Company
- Today part of: Indonesia

Inderapura (Minangkabau: Karajaan Indopuro, other name: Inderapura Dārul Qarār), also known as Ujung Pagaruyung, was a kingdom located in the Pesisir Selatan Regency, present-day West Sumatra, bordering Bengkulu Province and Jambi. Officially, the kingdom was a vassal of the Pagaruyung Kingdom, although in practice it was independent and free to manage its internal and external affairs. The kingdom in its heyday covered the west coast of Sumatra from Padang in the north to Sungai Hurai in the south. Inderapura's most important products were pepper and gold.

The influence of the Inderapura Kingdom reached Banten on the island of Java. Based on the Sajarah Banten, the Sultanate of Banten had made trade contacts with the Inderapura Kingdom which was marked by the gift of a kris from Sultan Munawar Syah to Sultan Hasanuddin. According to Hamka, Sultan Munawar Syah married his daughter to Hasanuddin and gifted Silebar (a pepper-producing area in Bengkulu) to the Sultanate of Banten.

== History ==
=== Origins ===
Inderapura was known as Ujung Pagaruyung (lit. 'Edge of Pagaruyung') in Minangkabau. As Inderapura originally constituted the southernmost extremity of the Minangkabau realm as western rantau or pasisir (dependencies). Inderapura together with Benkulen, Painan, Padang and Pariaman on the same coast, and Siak, Inderagiri and Jambi on the eastern flank, made up the eight bab or gateways to the kingdom. With the weakening of Pagaruyung's power during the 15th century, several other coastal Minangkabau regions, such as Inderagiri, Siak, Jambi and Inderapura were left to fend for themselves.

But the development of Inderapura only really began when Malacca fell to the Portuguese in 1511. Trade flows that had previously travelled through the Malacca Strait were largely shifted to the west coast of Sumatra and the Sunda Strait. Inderapura's development and expansion was mainly supported by pepper.

Exactly when Inderapura achieved the status of an independent state is not known with certainty. According to legend, Tuanku Darah Putih, the eldest of three sons of Cindua Mato, the legendary founder of Minangkabau endowed with supernatural powers, is said to have established the royal house at Inderapura, also known as Negeri Dua Puluh Kota. However, it is thought to have coincided with the start of the pepper trade in the region in the mid-16th century, fuelled by pepper cultivation efforts on Inderapura's southern boundary as far as Silebar (now in Bengkulu Province). By this time, Inderapura had established friendships with the Banten and Aceh sultanates.

=== Acehnese influence ===
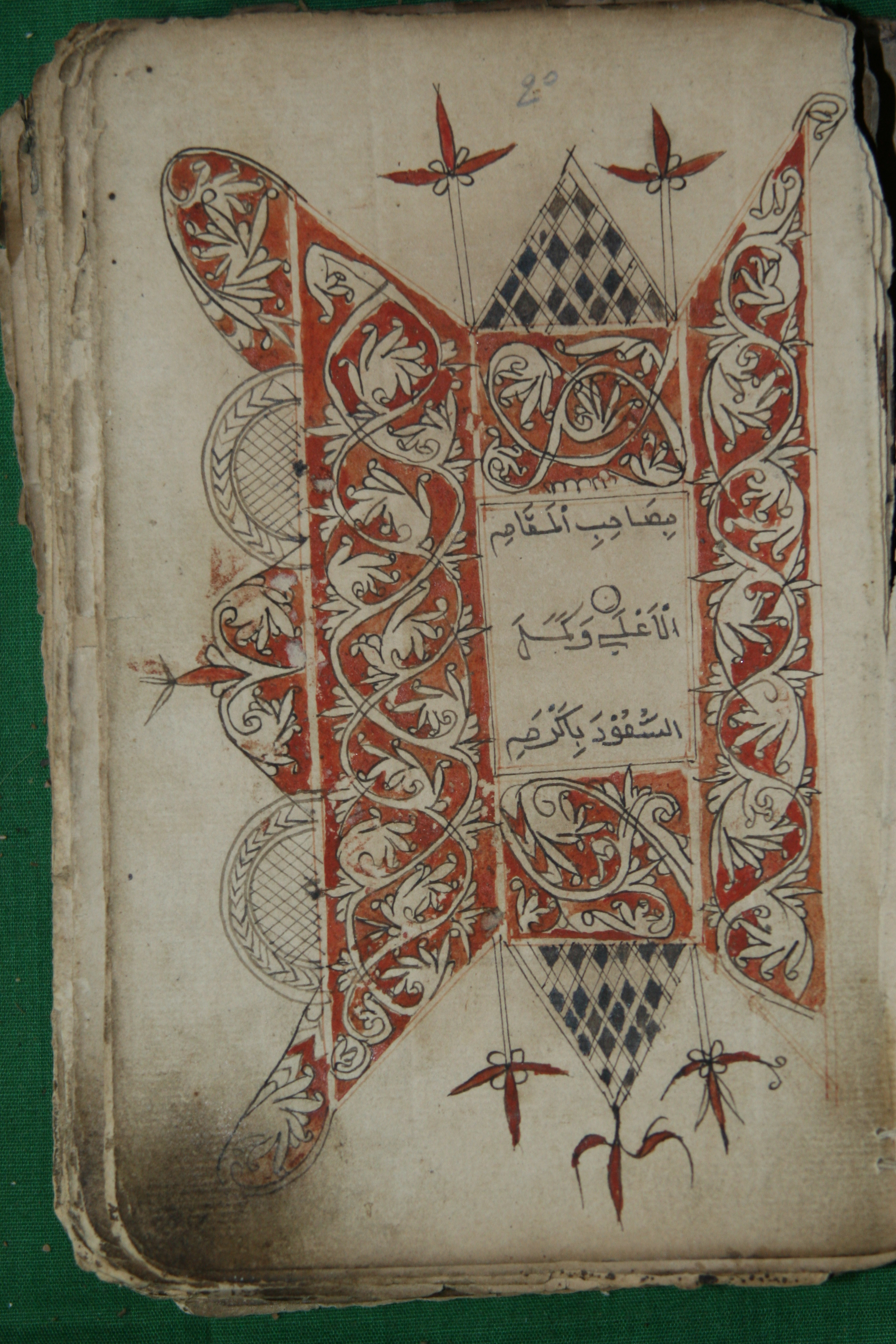
Old decorated Inderapura manuscript in Jawi script

When the Sultanate of Aceh expanded into the Pariaman region, Indrapura halted its expansion and formed a friendship with Aceh. Through a marriage between Raja Dewi, the daughter of Sultan Munawar Syah (Raja Mamulia) of Indrapura, with Sultan Firman Syah, brother of the then King of Aceh, Sultan Ali Ri'ayat Syah (1569–1575). Through this marital relationship and its economic power, Indrapura gained great influence in Kotaraja (Banda Aceh) and its court. Indeed, given Aceh's thriving commercial interests on the Minangkabau coast, it was in Aceh's best interests to cultivate an alliance with Inderapura to keep the vital sources of supply from the south open to the Minangkabau pepper ports.

Inderapura's immense economic sway in Aceh swiftly transformed into a commanding influence over the Kota Raja court, evoking profound anxiety among the ulama (Muslim scholars) and orangkaya (chiefs and noblemen) of Aceh. A hulubalang (district chief) from Indrapura are said to have collaborated in the assassination of Sultan Ali Ri'ayat Syah's son, thus paving the way for Raja Dewi's husband to ascend the throne and be renamed Sultan Sri Alam in 1576. Although his reign lasted only three years before he was ousted from the throne due to an incompetent administrative skills and conflict with Aceh's ulamas, especially in his addiction to cockfighting.

However, Indrapura's influence continued to persist in the Sultanate of Aceh from 1586 to 1588. A relative of Raja Dewi, Sultan Buyong, reigned under the title Sultan Ali Ri'ayat Syah II, before being killed through regicide by the machinations of Acehnese ulamas. Thus ending Inderapura's influence on Aceh's courts. By 1615, Aceh's succeeding monarch, Iskandar Muda, had stationed his representatives closer to the kingdom. By now, Acehnese control was soon extended to the Minangkabau ports as far south as Tiku and Pariaman. By in 1620, Acehnese influence extended well beyond Tabing (in Padang) or Kota Tengah.

According to Dutch reports, in 1616 Inderapura was described as a prosperous kingdom under the rule of Raja Itam, with around 30,000 people engaged in agriculture and plantations that relied on rice and pepper. Furthermore, during the time of Raja Besar around 1624, the Dutch East India Company (VOC) succeeded in making an agreement for the collection of agricultural products to be directly loaded onto ships without having to dock at the harbour first, as well as being exempted from port taxes. Likewise, during the time of Raja Puti, Raja Besar's successor, Inderapura continued to implement a duty-free harbour to boost its economy.

After the punitive expedition of 1633 by the Sultanate of Aceh, Inderapura was still unable to boost its agricultural output to the level it had achieved in earlier times until 1637. As Aceh's influence declined, Sultan Muzzaffar Syah began to consolidate his power, which was continued by his son Sultan Muhammad Syah who ascended the throne around 1660 and resumed diplomatic relations with the Dutch and British.

=== Reprisal and Dutch Interest ===
Under Sultan Iskandar Muda, the sultanate of Aceh fought the pepper-producing countries of the Malay Peninsula while trying to strengthen its grip on the monopoly of pepper from the West coast of Sumatra. The tight control of Aceh's Viceroys (referred to as panglima) in Tiku and Pariaman over pepper sales threatened Inderapura's trade through the northern ports. Inderapura therefore began to develop its southern port, Silebar, which was used to export pepper via Banten. The influx of British and Company traders at both Banten and Silebar provided additional impetus for Inderapura to shift its exports southward, away from aceh's grip. There were early Dutch efforts to collect Inderapura pepper at Silebar. But the difficulties of timing the pepper's arrival there, as well as competition with rival traders, eventually convinced them to try direct collection at Inderapura, even at the risk of getting dangerous diseases.

The conquest of Iskandar Muda, 1608–1637.

Sultan Iskandar Muda was alarmed by Inderapura's efforts to resist his commercial control. In 1626, Wide spread rumors circulated among Inderapura peoples, about the Acehnese sovereign's plans to extend his authority further south towards Silebar, but they evidently had no effect on Inderapura's foreign policy. When Raja Besar died and his brother Raja Puti took over, he also defied Aceh and continued the duty-free trade with the Dutch. This culminated to Inderapura refusing and trying to evade paying taxes to the Acehnese commanders. This angered the Acehnese rulers who sent a fleet in 1633 to punish Inderapura. Raja Puti who ruled Inderapura at the time was executed along with several other nobles. All pepper cargo available were seized and many people were taken prisoner to be brought to Kotaraja. The Dutch did not respond for a reprisal as Sultan Iskandar Muda encouraged transactions with the Dutch. Aceh stationed its commander in Inderapura and Raja Malfarsyah, grandson of Raja Dewi and close connection with Aceh's royal house, was appointed king in place of Raja Puti.

Aceh's control weakened when it was led by Iskandar Muda's successor, Sultan Iskandar Tsani. Furthermore, during the reign of Ratu Tajul Alam, Aceh's influence in Inderapura, particularly along the southern fringe of its empire on the west coast began to be replaced by the Dutch (VOC). The foremost exponent of the Dutch forward policy on the west coast was Johan Groenewegen, who was appointed Resident at Aceh in 1659. Company policy toward Inderapura under Groenewegen was significantly different from Aceh's in its heyday, and was temporarily conducive to the resurgence of local political groups. Whereas Aceh attempted to administer its conquered territories directly through royal representatives, the Dutch desired minimal administrative involvement at this stage. Acehnese policy had previously meant the suppression of indigenous political life, but the Dutch now saw it as critical to strengthen local authority to protect against external threats and to maintain local internal cohesion, both of which are required for peaceful trade.

=== Decline and power struggle ===
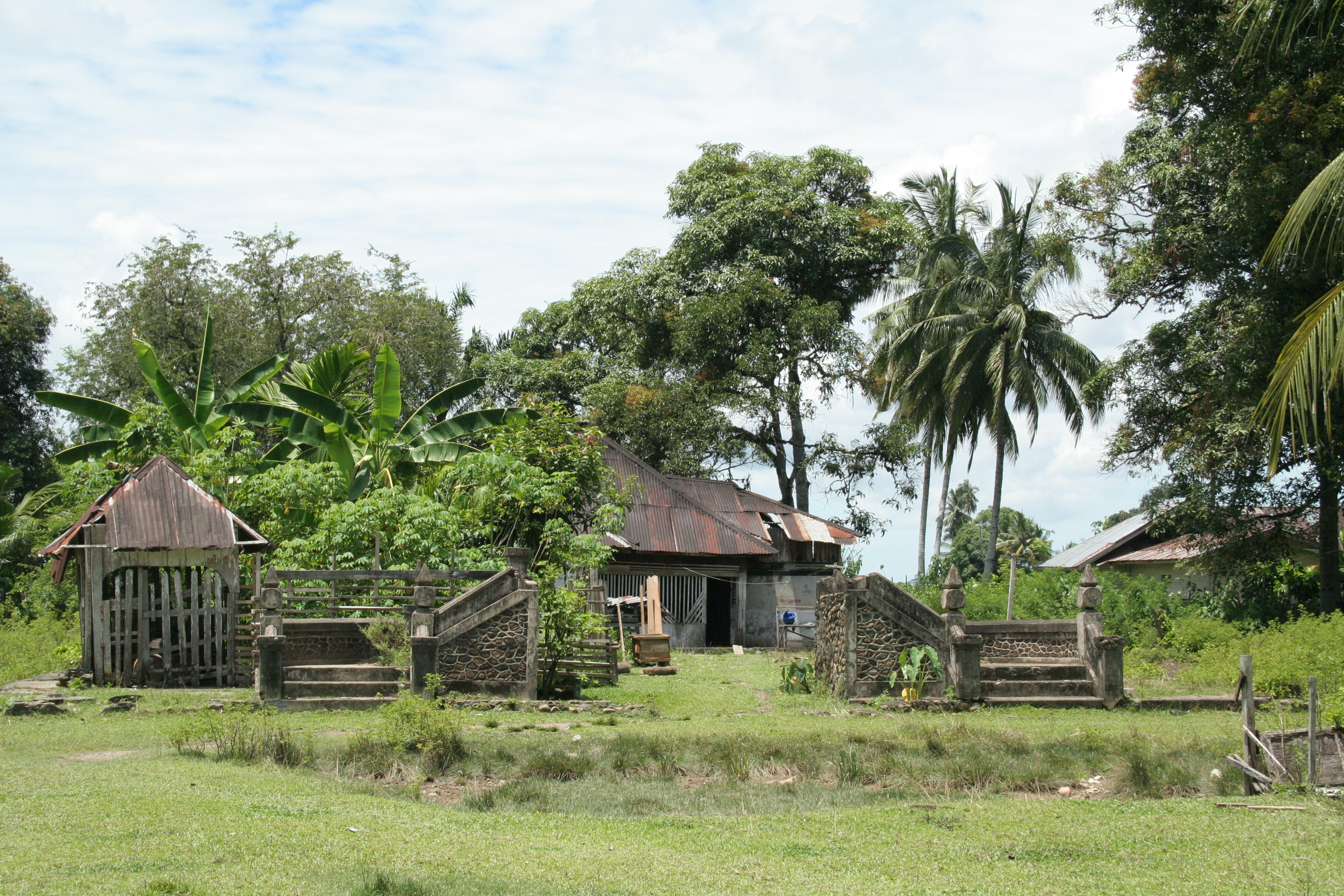
Ruins of the former Indrapura Sultanate Palace

Raja Muzzaffar Syah's appointment of his son, Muhammad Syah, as successor. This did not follow the existing Minangkabau succession principle which, although in all other respects stringly matrilineal, recognized the patriline in the case of the rulership. Not until the death in 1676 of Sultan Ahmad Syah, ruler at Pagaruyung, was the rule challenged in Minangkabau proper, when the title of Raja Alam was contested between his son and nephew. This struggle was apparently settled in 1683 in favor of the matrilineal system, but had been anticipated some two decades earlier by a similar institutional challenge in Inderapura.

Although the inauguration of Muhammad Syah as sultan did not meet opposition from the menteri, the subsequent extension of his authoritarian influence into the Negeri Empat Belas Kota (or Menjuto) provoked a reaction. De facto authority in this region was in the hands of Raja Adil (or Raja Itam), Raja Muzzaffar Syah's eldest sister's son. He had the undivided support of the fourteen menteri who favored the matrilineal tradition, but the old Muzzaffar Syah, ignoring popular wishes, appointed his son-in-law Sulaiman to the rank of wakil (deputy). This was a deliberately calculated move to hold Raja Adil in check in the knowledge that the young chief aimed ultimately at attaining the rulership of Inderapura on the basis of his matrilineal claims, as opposed to the patrilineal claims of Sultan Muhammad Syah. Fueled by discontent, Raja Adil forged a rebellion that ignited internal dissent within Inderapura. This uprising, spearheaded by Raja Adil, was sparked by his unwavering conviction in the right to claim the throne, grounded in the matrilineal system.

Unprepared, Sultan Muhammad Syah and his father asked the Dutch for help in quelling the rebellion in Inderapura in 1662. As a result, the Sultan of Inderapura was forced to flee along with his father and relatives. Sultan Mansur Syah was sent to Batavia to sign a treaty in 1663 granting the VOC a monopoly on pepper purchases and the right to work the gold mines. Thus the domination of the VOC in Inderapura was secured. In October 1663 the government of Inderapura was restored under firm VOC influence, and the Sultan of Inderapura recognised Raja Adil as his representative in Manjuto.

== Governance ==
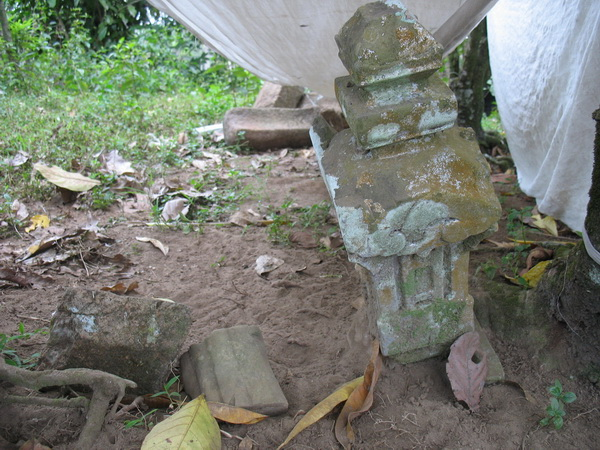
One of the tombs of the king of Inderapura

Etymologically, Inderapura comes from Sanskrit, and can mean "City of Kings" (Indonesian: Kota Raja). Inderapura was originally an overseas region (rantau) of Minangkabau, a coastal area on the west coast of Sumatra Island. As an overseas region, Inderapura was ruled by an appointed representative from Pagaruyung and held the title of Raja later also took the title of Sultan. Raja Inderapura is identified as the son of Raja Alam or Yang Dipertuan Pagaruyung.

=== List of Inderapura kings ===
Below are the list of the Rajas of Inderapura:

Year	Name or Title	Notes or Events
1550	Sultan Munawar Syah; Raja Mamulia	
1580	Raja Dewi	Other name by Putri Rekna Candra Dewi
1616	Raja Itam	
1624	Raja Besar	
1625	Raja Puti	Other name by Putri Rekna Alun
1633	Sultan Muzzaffar Syah; Raja Malfarsyah	
1660	Sultan Muhammad Syah	Raja Adil according to equal rights
1691	Sultan Mansur Syah	Sultan Gulemat, son of King Adil, residing in Manjuto, broke away from Inderapura.
1696	Raja Pesisir	
1760	Raja Pesisir II	
1790	Raja Pesisir III	

== Territory ==
In the late 17th century, the centre of Inderapura covered the valleys of the Airhaji and Batang Inderapura rivers and consisted of twenty koto. Each koto was ruled by a minister, who functioned like a penghulu in other Minangkabau regions. As for the Anak Sungai region, which included the Manjuto and Airdikit valleys (referred to as Negeri Empat Belas Koto), and Muko-muko (Lima Koto), the system of government was similar.

The northern region is called Banda Sapuluah (Bandar Sepuluh), which is led by Rajo nan Ampek (four kings; Raja Airhaji, Raja Bungo Pasang, Raja Kambang, Raja Palangai). This area is a kind of confederation of 10 regions or nagari (negeri), each of which is also led by 10 penghulu.

In the southern part of the region, where the governmental system consisting of villages is under the authority of the peroatin (the chief responsible for settling disputes at the mouth of the river). These peroatins originally numbered 59 (peroatin nan less one sixty). These ministers and peroatin were subject to the authority of the king or sultan.

=== Dutch Era ===
In 1663, the Dutch through the VOC made a contract with the Indrapura Kingdom regarding territorial boundaries. The VOC at that time declared the boundaries of the Indrapura Kingdom with other territories with an agreement which was later named "Verbond Indrapoera". The boundaries declared by the VOC were marked or symbolised by nature, such as the sea, mountains, and specific areas.

- In the north, the territory of the Indrapura Kingdom extended to Air Bangis, up to the port of Air Bangis and directly adjacent to the Batang Toru Kingdom (also known as the Batak Kingdom).
- The south of the kingdom extended to Ketaun, which led to Taratak Air Hitam, an area that was included in the Srivijaya Empire.
- The eastern part of its territory extends to the highest mountain on the island of Sumatra, which is now called Mount Kerinci and is directly adjacent to the Kingdom of Jambi.
- The west bordered the open sea.

The boundaries of the Indrapura Kingdom were eventually recognised by other kingdoms in the archipelago, especially those in close proximity. In addition, the boundaries were also recognised by kingdoms outside the archipelago, such as Malacca and the kingdoms in the Chinese realm.

In 1665, the VOC released a map containing the division of territory on the west coast. The map also described the boundaries of the Indrapura Kingdom, but they were different from the previous boundaries.
