= Marawa Minangkabau =

Sumatran ethnic flag

- Basa Alam Minangkabau
- Use: Luhak Nan Tigo and rantau
- Proportion: 2:3
- Adopted: 1347 (by Pagaruyung Darul Qarar); 675 years ago
- Design: A vertical tricolour of black, red, and gold
- Minangkabau Customs Flag
- Use: Customary Institutions
- Proportion: 2:3
- Adopted: Unknown
- Design: A four-color vertical chart composed of black-gold-white-red
- Negeri Sembilan
- Use: State flag of Negeri Sembilan
- Proportion: 1:2
- Adopted: 1895
- Design: Basa Alam with gold as the base color, diagonal canton with red on the top and black on the bottom.

Marawa is a tricolour flag that consists of three vertical charts that feature the colours of the Minangkabau culture: black, red, and gold. It is not known for sure when this flag was first used, but it was officially adopted as the flag of the Pagaruyung Kingdom since its founding in 1347. This flag was also adopted by other kingdoms of the Minangkabau rantau such as the Inderapura Kingdom. A derivative of the flag is also currently used by Negeri Sembilan, a state in Malaysia with historical and cultural connections with the kingdom.

Black represents pangulu, gold represents manti, white represents malin, and red represents dubalang.

== Origins ==
The association of Minangkabau with the colours black, red, and gold (or yellow) is unknown, but the black-red-gold flag was traditionally used to symbolise the Luhak Nan Tigo (Minangkabau Confederation) established in the Minangkabau Highlands by their ancestors, as well as the area of origin of the Minang people before they migrated to areas beyond. The black colour represents Luhak Limo Puluah (Lima Puluh Kota Regency and Payakumbuh City), the red colour represents Luhak Agam (Agam Regency, Bukittinggi City, Padang Pariaman Regency, Pariaman City, and Padang City), and the gold colour represents Luhak Tanah Data (Tanah Datar Regency and surrounding areas).

Besides symbolising nature, each colour also represents key philosophical values. Black for the Minangkabau people has the meaning of eternity, or called tahan tampo (resistant to forging), red symbolises courage and endurance, while gold symbolises majesty, brilliance and shine. Moreover, in Minangkabau customs, these three colours also symbolise Tali Tigo Sapilin, Tungku Tigo Sajarangan (Triumvirate of Minangkabau Nature), that is ninik mamak, cerdik pandai and alim ulama. Ninik mamak is symbolised in black, cerdik pandai in red, and alim ulama in gold.

== Variations ==
=== Basa Alam Minangkabau Flag ===
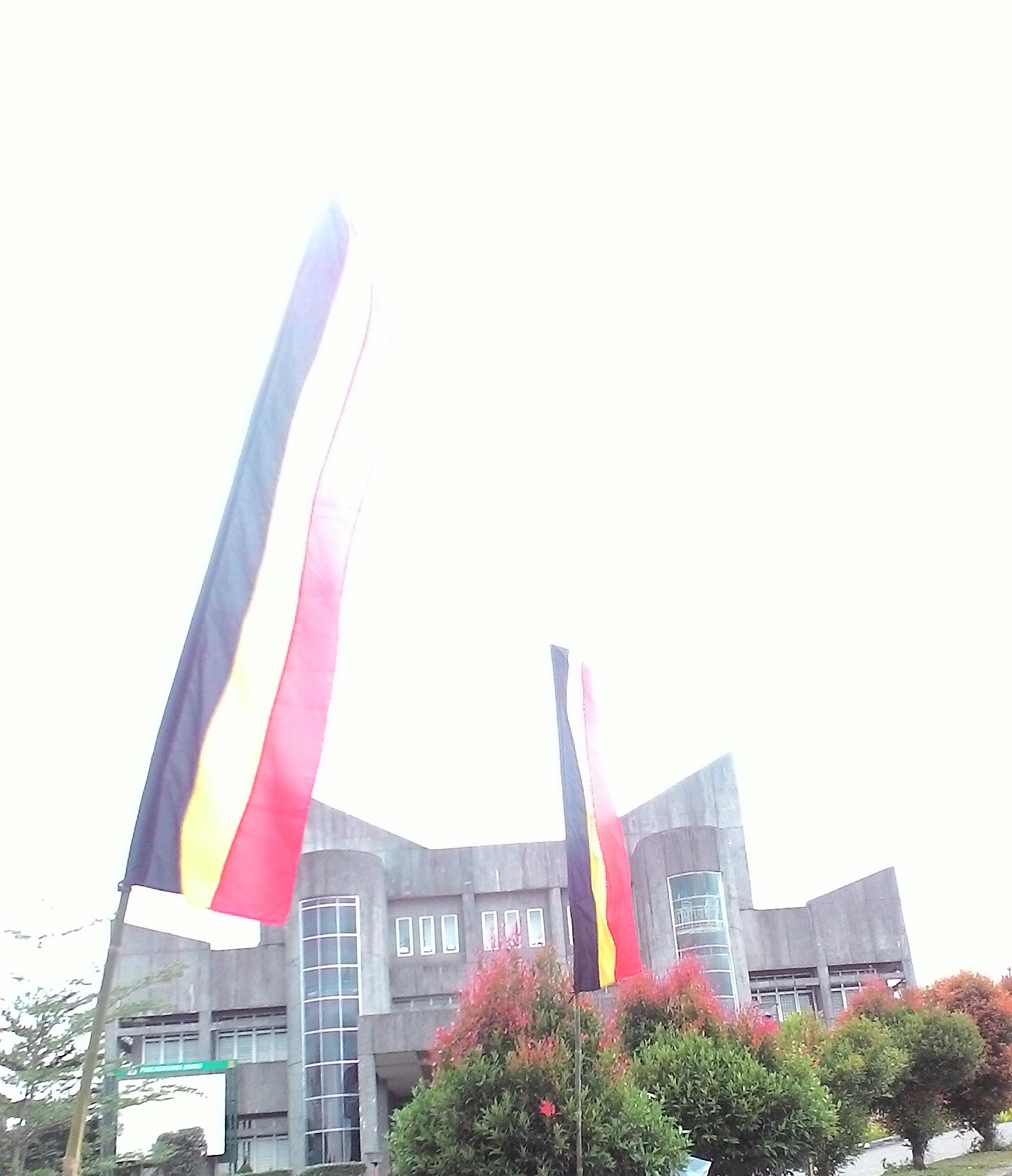
Black-gold-red coloured flags at the postgraduate school building, Andalas University, Padang.

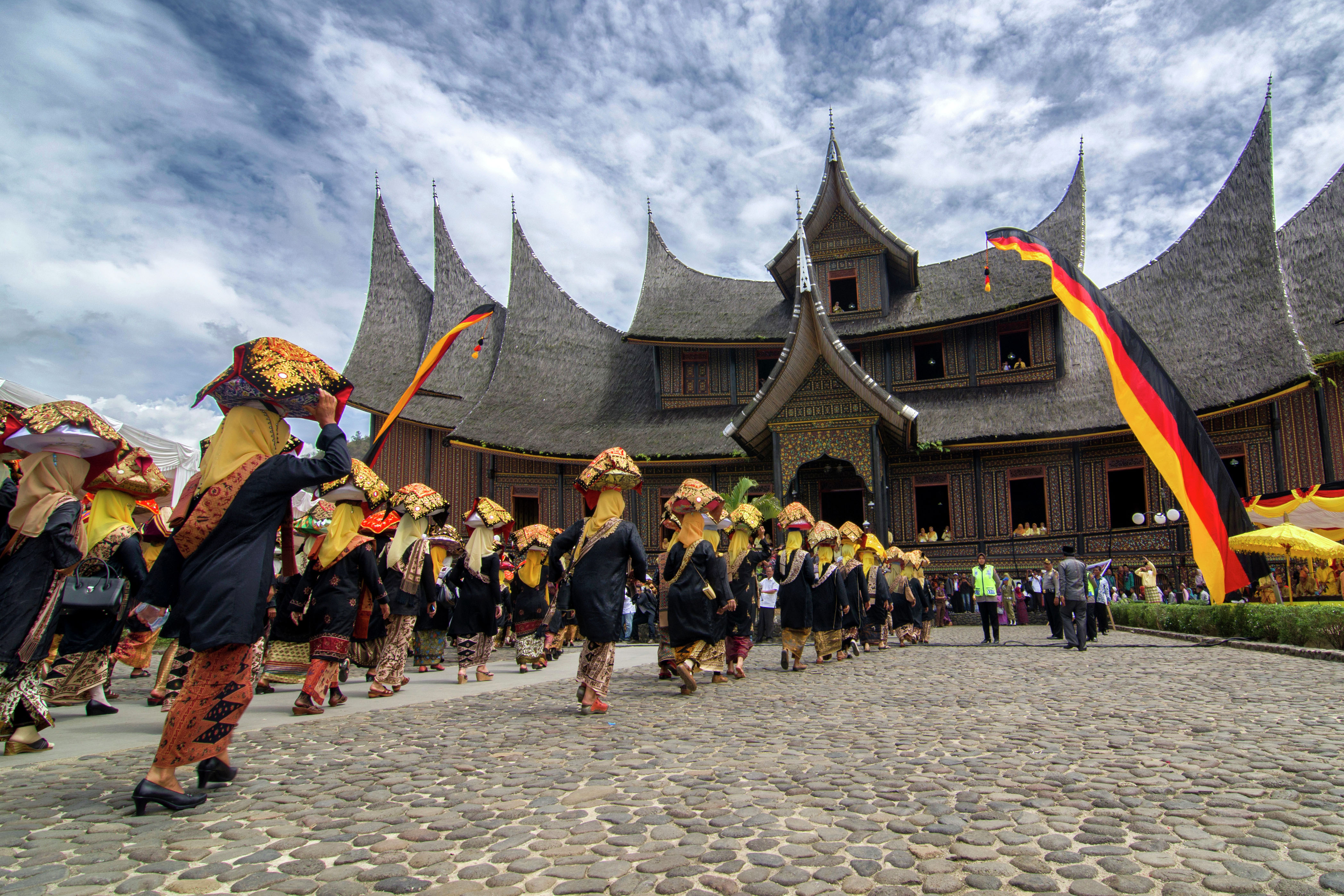
The black-red-gold colour arrangement at the Istano Basa Pagaruyung.

Since the establishment of the Minangkabau Confederation, the Minangkabau people had two basic configurations of basa (big) colours, black-red-gold and black-gold-white-red and black-gold-white-red. Black-red-gold are the colours of Basa Alam Minangkabau, the Minangkabau Confederation, the Kingdom of Pagaruyung, and the predecessor kingdoms derived from the Tambo Alam Minangkabau.

Certain chiefdoms, or luhaks/luaks, in West Sumatra have their own different Marawa designs. The colour arrangement varies according to the region or region of origin that uses the flag. The different arrangement of black, red, and gold on the three luhaks are called the Luhak Nan Tigo flags. Each corresponding luhaks has its own. Luhak Tanah Data, mostly located on Tanah Datar Regency, uses the oldest combination of black-red-gold. The Luhak Agam region, whose territory includes Nagari Padang, Pariaman, Bukittinggi, uses the black-gold-red. The second oldest out of the three. Then lastly, the yellow-red-black colour arrangement is used in the Luhak Limo Puluh region or those who use it come from Limo Puluh and Payakumbuh city.

These flag colours are also the traditional colours in Minangkabau, the basic colours of traditional house decorations or motifs, the dominant colours on the aisle and the traditional banner, which is used in every official state ceremony in Minangkabau.

Marawa Tanah Data

Marawa Agam

Marawa Limo Puluah Koto

=== Minangkabau Customs Flag ===
The Minangkabau folk flag (Marawa Basa Adat Minangkabau) is a four-colour vertical chart composed of black-gold-white-red, which symbolizes the four leaders of the Minangkabau clan (Urang Nan Ampek Jinih). Black represents the chieftain (pangulu), gold represents the law enforcement elders (manti) who arbitrate tribal customary law, white represents the priests in charge of religious affairs (malin) and red represents the warrior chief (dubalang) who guards the village. This flag is only used at official ceremonies of the Ninik Mamak Pemangku Adat bases, such as at the ceremony of taking their oath of office.

Apart from Urang Nan Ampek Jinih, in Minangkabau custom, there is another important position, bundo kanduang, which is the mother who is the teacher in the rumah gadang and has the title Limpapeh Rumah Nan Gadang.

=== Flag of Negeri Sembilan ===
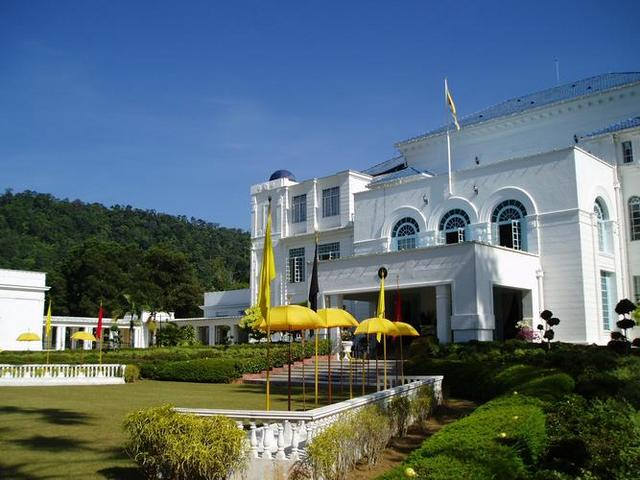
Rows of black, red and gold marquees at the compounds of Istana Besar, the official residence of the Yang di-Pertuan Besar of Negeri Sembilan in Seri Menanti.

The flag of Negeri Sembilan's connection with the Marawa is far from coincidence. The flag's colours took inspiration from the original Minangkabau settlers in the Negeri Sembilan area after migrating from the Alam Minangkabau (Minangkabau homeland) in Sumatra to the Malay peninsula. However, the flag colours' symbolism differ from the Marawa.

The flag ofNegeri Sembilan is composed of gold as the flag's base colour, and a diagonally bisected canton of red across the top, and black at the bottom. The flag was inaugurated in 1895 during the reign of Tuanku Muhammad, following the union of several luaks into a single political entity, with help from the British. This is the second and current iteration of Negeri Sembilan, since its early formation in 1773 and subsequent breakup several years later. The flag is in use to this day, since the state's inception into the Federated Malay States the same year, until the formation of Malaysia in 1963.

== See also ==
- Flag of Batak
- Flags of Belgium, the Federated Malay States and Germany, all sport a coincidentally similar colour scheme
- Karamentang
- Malay tricolour
- Umbul-umbul
