= Sultan Buyung =

Ali Ri'ayat Syah II علي رعاية شاه الثاني
- Sultan
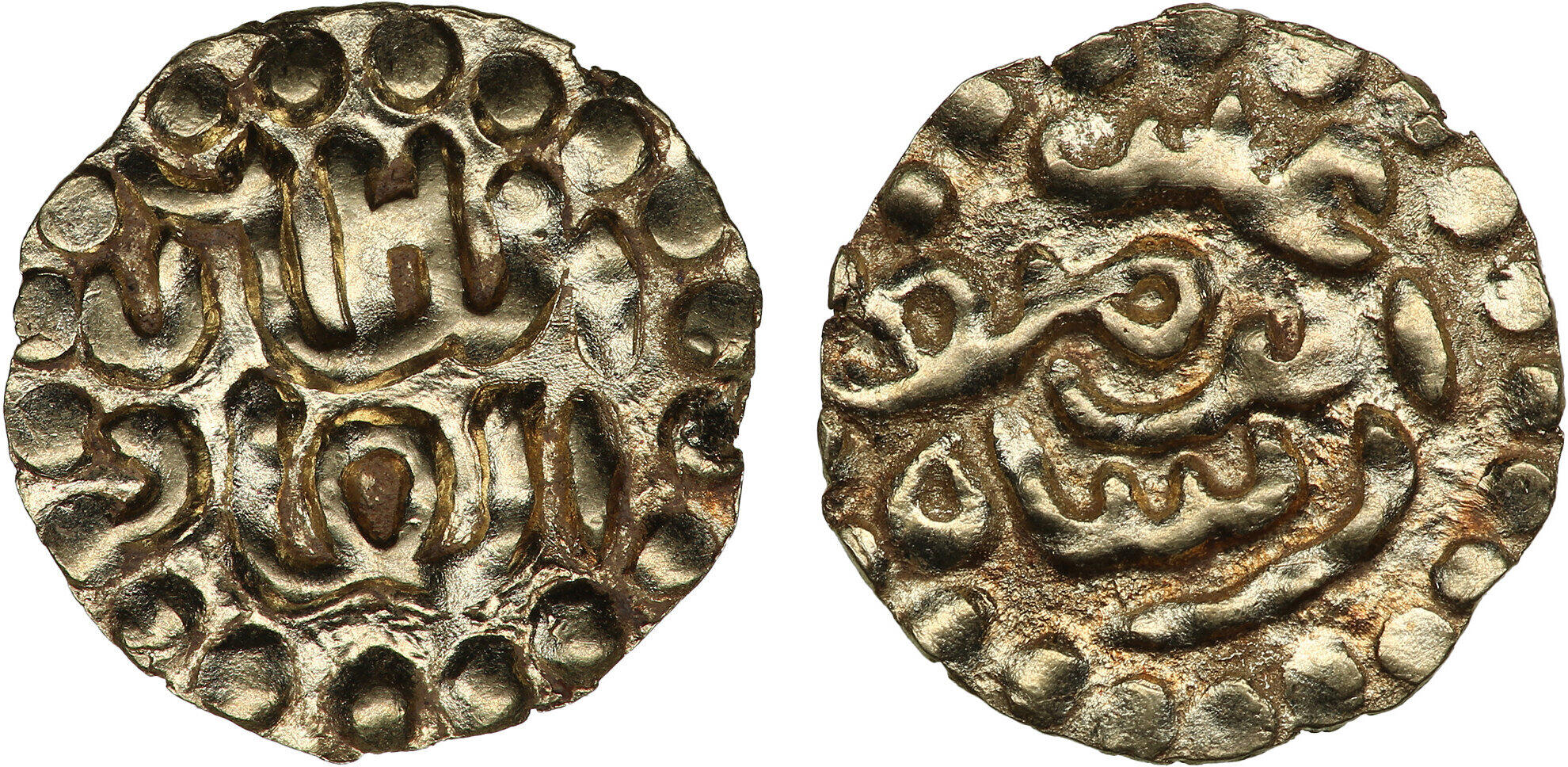
- Coin of Aceh from the era of Sultan Buyung Ali Riayat Syah II.

Sultan of Aceh Sultanate
- Reign: 1585/1586 – 28 June 1589
- Predecessor: Alauddin Mansur Syah
- Successor: Alauddin Ri'ayat Syah Sayyid al-Mukammal
- Born: Banda Aceh, Aceh Sultanate
- Died: 28 June 1589; Banda Aceh, Aceh Sultanate
- House: Inderapura
- Father: Munawwar Syah bin Muhammad Syah

Sultan Buyung or Ali Ri'ayat Syah II (died 28 June 1589) was the ninth sultan of Aceh in northern Sumatra. He had a short and contested reign from 1585/85 to 1589, ending with his violent demise.

== Indrapura origins ==
Sultan Buyung did not belong to the sultan's family of Aceh but originated from Indrapura on the west coast of Sumatra. His background is known from epigraphic data: he was the son of Munawwar Syah, son of Muhammad Syah, son of Almalik Zainuddin. This indicates that Indrapura had been ruled by a Muslim dynasty since at least 1500. The sister of Sultan Buyung, Raja Dewi, was married to Sultan Mughal alias Sri Alam who was sultan of Aceh for a brief period in 1579. At a time the prince went to Aceh to be with his widowed sister. When he had stayed there for two months the current sultan Alauddin Mansur Syah was murdered. This happened in early 1585 according to the chronicles but in 1586 according to a Portuguese account.

== Contested reign ==
After the murder of Alauddin Mansur Syah, Sultan Buyung was raised to the throne with the throne name Sultan Ali Ri'ayat Syah. The precise reasons why he was selected are not known to us, but there was apparently a lack of grown-up candidates. The old sultan left a young grandson, Raja Asyem, who may have been supported by part of the orang kayas (grandees) but was too young to reign. Raja Asyem was protected by an old military of humble background, the later sultan Alauddin Ri'ayat Syah Sayyid al-Mukammal who had allegedly murdered the boy's grandfather. Thus Aceh appears to have been politically divided during Sultan Buyung's brief reign. Of political events, we only know that the hostilities with the Portuguese in Melaka ceased in his reign. Relations between the Portuguese and the leading Malay kingdom Johor deteriorated after 1585 and the Johorese suffered a disastrous military defeat in 1587. As a consequence of this an Acehnese envoy appeared in Melaka and a peace was concluded. The result of all this was that the sea-roads between the Malay Peninsula and Sumatra became free and trade expanded greatly. The peace held on for the next 19 years. Finally, the sultan was murdered under unclear circumstances on 28 June 1589 by "all the grandees" of the kingdom. Thus he was the fourth ruler in succession to be killed. The throne was now taken by Alauddin Ri'ayat Syah Sayyid al-Mukammal, who claimed descent from the 15th-century rulers of Aceh. His accession made an end to ten years of violent political infighting.

== Literature ==
- Dagh-Register 1673 (1901). 's Gravenhage & Batavia: M. Nijhoff & Landsdrukkerij.
- Djajadiningrat, Raden Hoesein (1911) 'Critisch overzicht van de in Maleische werken vervatte gegevens over de geschiedenis van het soeltanaat van Atjeh', Bijdragen tot de Taal-, Land- en Volkenkunde 65, pp. 135–265.
- Encyclopaedie van Nederlandsch Indië, Vol. 1 (1917). 's Gravenhage & Leiden: Nijhoff & Brill.
- Penth, Hans (1969) Hikajat Atjeh: Die Erzählung von der Abkunft und den Jugendjaren des Sultan Iskandar Muda von Atjeh (Sumatra). Wiesbaden: Otto Harrassowitz.

Preceded by Alauddin Mansur Syah	Sultan of Aceh Sultanate; 1585/86 – 28 June 1589	Succeeded by Alauddin Ri'ayat Syah Sayyid al-Mukammal
