= Alauddin Mansur Syah =

Sultan of Aceh (1579–1585/6)

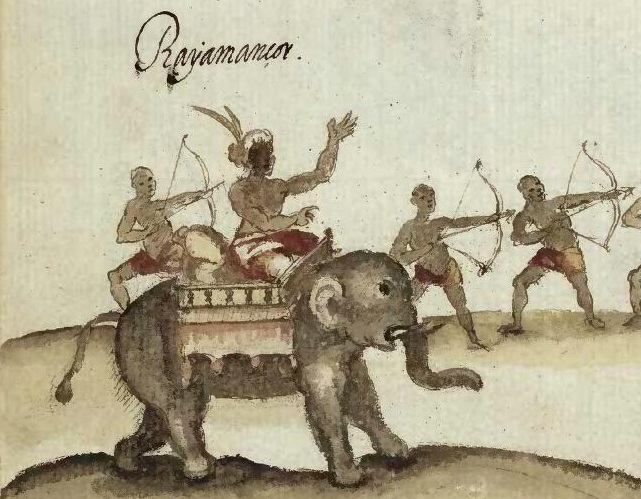

Sultan of Aceh Sultanate
- Reign: 5 October 1579 – 1585/1586
- Predecessor: Zainul Abidin
- Successor: Sultan Buyung
- Born: Negeri Perak
- Died: 1585/1586; Banda Aceh, Aceh Sultanate
- Spouse: Abdul Khana, son of Sayyid Abdullah bin Syeikh Al-Aydarus
- Issue: Sayyid Zainal-'Abidin Alaydrus
- House: Melaka-Perak-Aceh
- Father: Mansur Shah I of Perak

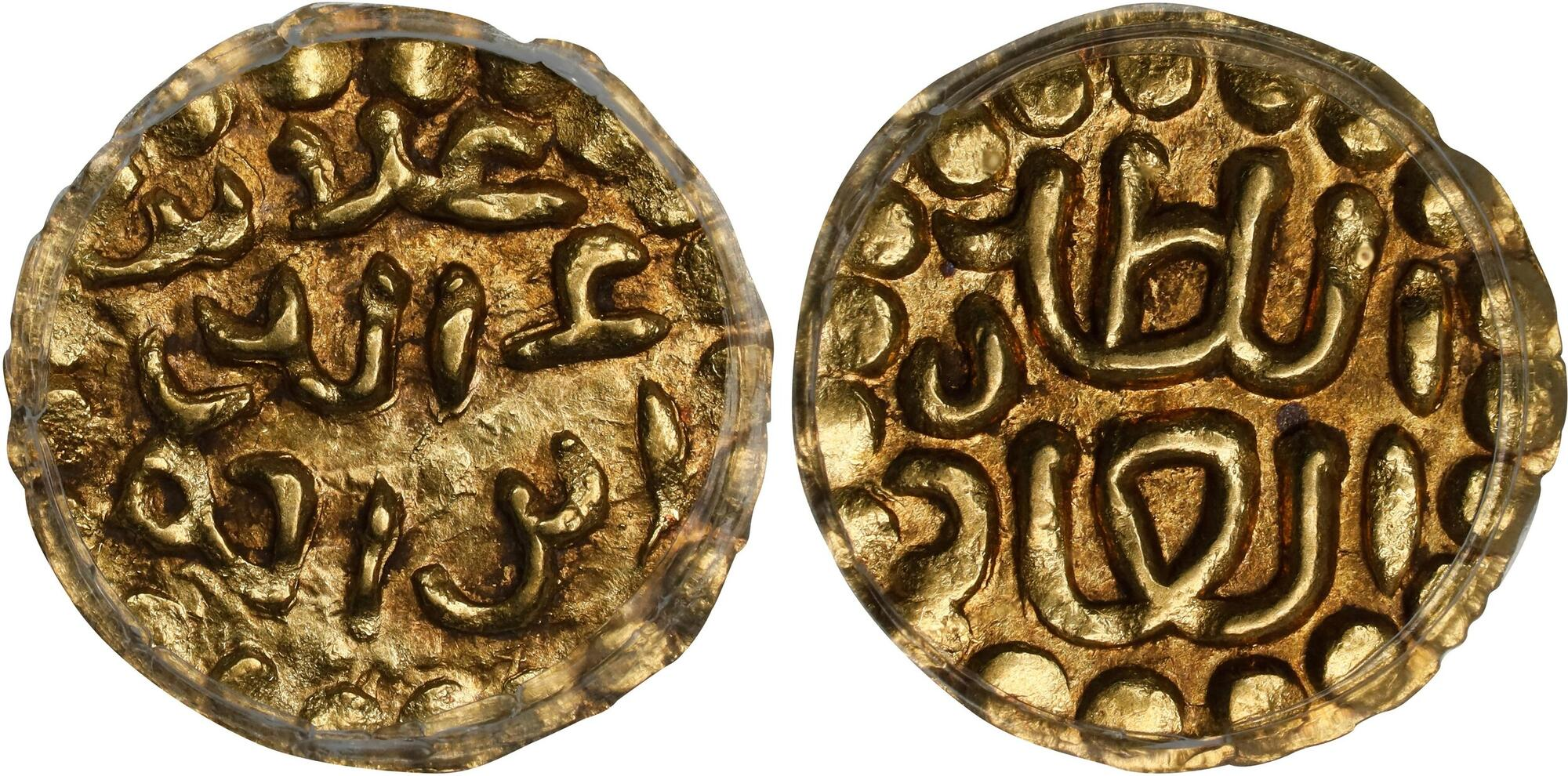
Aceh coin from the era of Sultan Alauddin Mansur Shah.

Sultan Alauddin Mansur Syah (died 1585 or 1586) was the eighth Sultan of Aceh in northern Sumatra. He ruled Aceh from 1579 to 1585 or 1586 and was known as a pious Muslim ruler with cultural interests. His reign also saw some military expansion on the Malay Peninsula. With his death ended a 65-year long period of warfare between Aceh and the Portuguese.

== Background ==
The Acehnese sultan Ali Ri'ayat Syah I attacked and defeated the tin-producing Malay kingdom Perak in 1573. The widow and children of the slain Sultan Mansur Shah I of Perak were brought along to Aceh. After the death of Ali Ri'ayat Syah in 1579 three sultans sat on the shaky throne in the course of four months. When the last, Zainul Abidin was killed, there were probably no more adult descendants of Ali Mughayat Syah. As a descendant of both the old Melaka sultans and descendants of "what is believed by court contemporaries as Iskandar Zulkarnain (Alexander the Great)", Prince Mansur was considered eligible. He was placed on the throne under the name Sultan Alauddin Mansur Syah, in about October 1579.

== Reign ==
Sultan Alauddin Mansur is praised by the chronicles for his pious demeanour. He ordered his uleëbalangs (chiefs) to grow a beard and wear jubba and turban - in other words to dress Arabic. During his reign many ulemas from other parts of the Islamic world visited Aceh. The sources mention Shaykh Abd al-Khair from Mecca who taught about dogma and mysticism, Shaykh Muhammad Yamani who taught about fiqh, and Shaykh Muhammad Jailani from Ranir in Gujarat, uncle of the more famous scholar Nuruddin ar-Raniri who taught logic, rhetoric, etc. In 1582 the sultan dispatched a fleet against Johor on the Malay Peninsula. On its way thither it attacked Portuguese Melaka without success. However, Johor was successfully sacked. Although it was a Muslim power, Johor was seen as a dangerous rival in the region. The enterprise was a stage in the triangular fight between Aceh, Johor and the Portuguese which enabled the last-mentioned to hold out.

== Assassination ==
New plans to attack the Portuguese were drawn up, but never came to fruition. In 1585 or 1586 he was murdered under unclear circumstances. According to the Portuguese chronicler Diogo do Couto a general and former slave, Mora Ratissa, killed him. According to a French account the murderer was a fisherman who had risen in the ranks of the kingdom through his military courage; this person later became sultan of Aceh under the name Alauddin Ri'ayat Syah Sayyid al-Mukammal. The murdered ruler left a young grandson, Raja Asyem, born from his daughter and the Johor sultan Ali Jalla Abdul Jalil Shah II. However, the successor of Sultan Alauddin Mansur Syah was another non-Acehnese, Sultan Buyung from Indrapura.

== See also ==
- Acehnese-Portuguese conflicts

== Literature ==
- Djajadiningrat, Raden Hoesein (1911) 'Critisch overzicht van de in Maleische werken vervatte gegevens over de geschiedenis van het soeltanaat van Atjeh', Bijdragen tot de Taal-, Land- en Volkenkunde 65, pp. 135–265.
- Encyclopaedie van Nederlandsch Indië, Vol. 1 (1917). 's Gravenhage & Leiden: Nijhoff & Brill.
- Hadi, Amirul (2004) Islam and State in Sumatra: A Study of Seventeenth-Century Aceh. Leiden: Brill.
- Iskandar, Teuku (1958) De Hikajat Atjeh. 's Gravenhage: M. Nijhoff.

Preceded by Zainul Abidin	Sultan of Aceh Sultanate; 1579–1585/86	Succeeded by Sultan Buyung
