= Flag and coat of arms of Negeri Sembilan =

Symbols of the Malaysian state

The flag and the coat of arms of Negeri Sembilan are state symbols of Negeri Sembilan, Malaysia. The symbols are predominantly depicted in red, black and yellow, traditional colours of the Minangkabau people who are the original settlers in the present-day state (see: the Marawa Minangkabau). Also recognised in the symbols are the political history of Negeri Sembilan, its ruler, and the state's past relationship with the British Empire.

== Flag ==
Negeri Sembilan
- Use: Civil and state flag
- Proportion: 1:2
- Adopted: 1895
- Design: A yellow field with a canton divided diagonally into red upper portion and black lower portion.

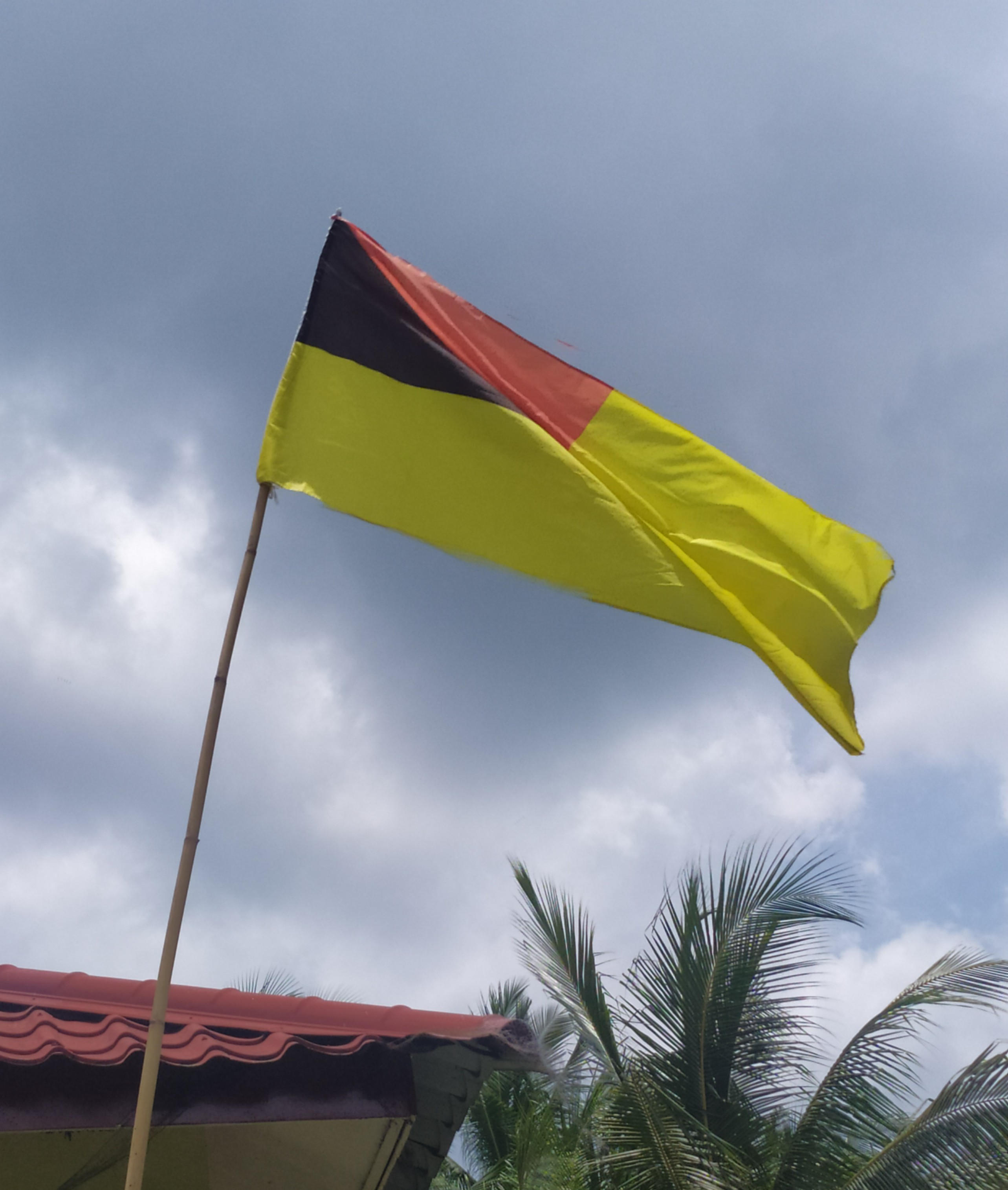
The flag being flown on a makeshift flagpole, made of bamboo

The Marawa Minangkabau, in which the Negri flag's colours are based on

Adopted in 1895, the flag of Negeri Sembilan consists of a yellow flag with a canton on the upper hoist, which is divided diagonally from the corner of the upper hoist towards the corner of the lower fly. The upper portion of the canton is coloured red, while the lower portion is coloured black, uncannily resembles both the flag of Papua New Guinea and the flag of anarcho-communism. Prior to 1942, the British Resident of Negeri Sembilan was also assigned the same flag, with the exception it is forked at the fly.

The symbolisation of the flag is primarily concentrated towards the association of its colours with the people of the state. The yellow represents the Yang di-Pertuan Besar of Negeri Sembilan, the red denotes the citizens of the state, and the black symbolises the four undangs (traditional chiefs).

=== Royal standard ===
The standard of the Yang di-Pertuan Besar is a yellow flag charged with a red lozenge, inscribed within it is a black circle with the Yamtuan's personal emblem: the spear, Changgai Putri fronted by a sword and scabbard.

Standard of the Yang di-Pertuan Besar

=== Customary flags ===
Certain chiefdoms, or luaks, in Negeri Sembilan have their own flag for ceremonial uses during Adat Perpatih events. They are hardly seen in daily government administrative functions.

Flags of chiefdoms in Negeri Sembilan
Sungei Ujong (formally)

Jelebu

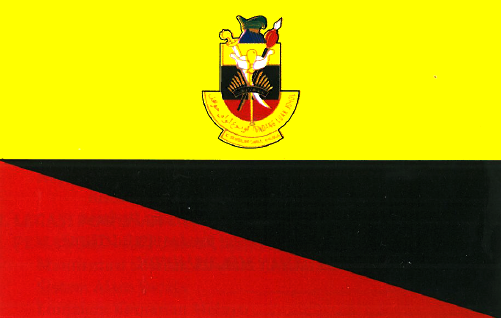
Johol

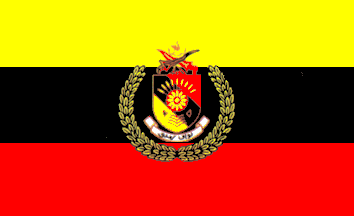
Rembau

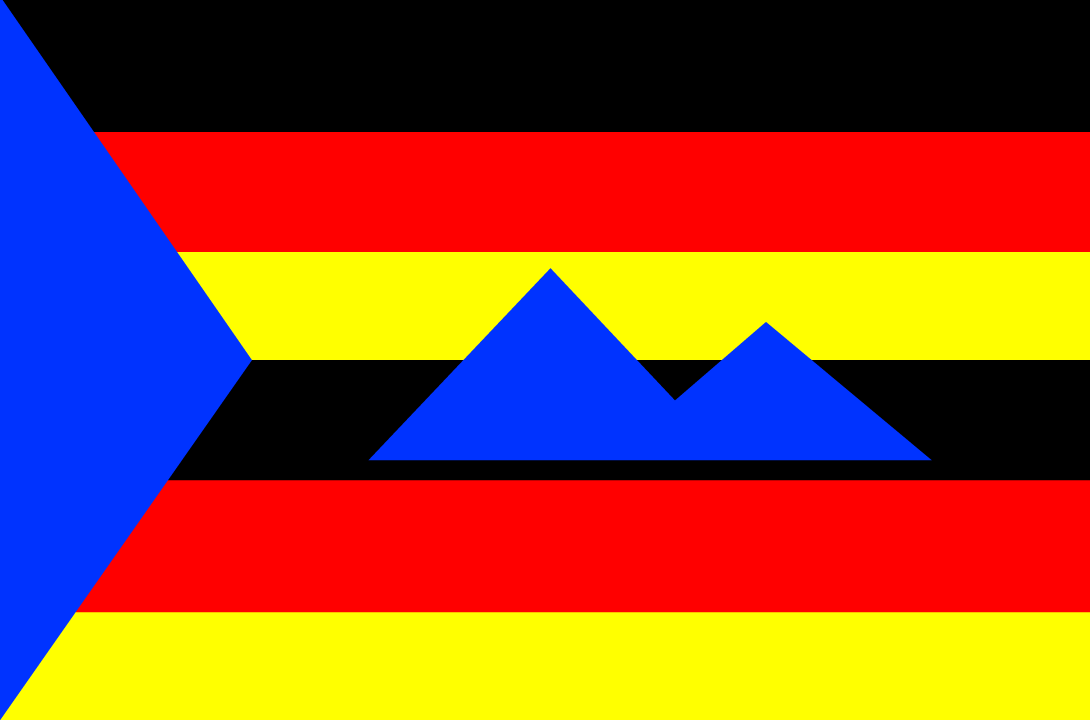
Gunung Pasir

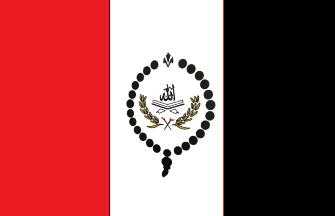
Terachi

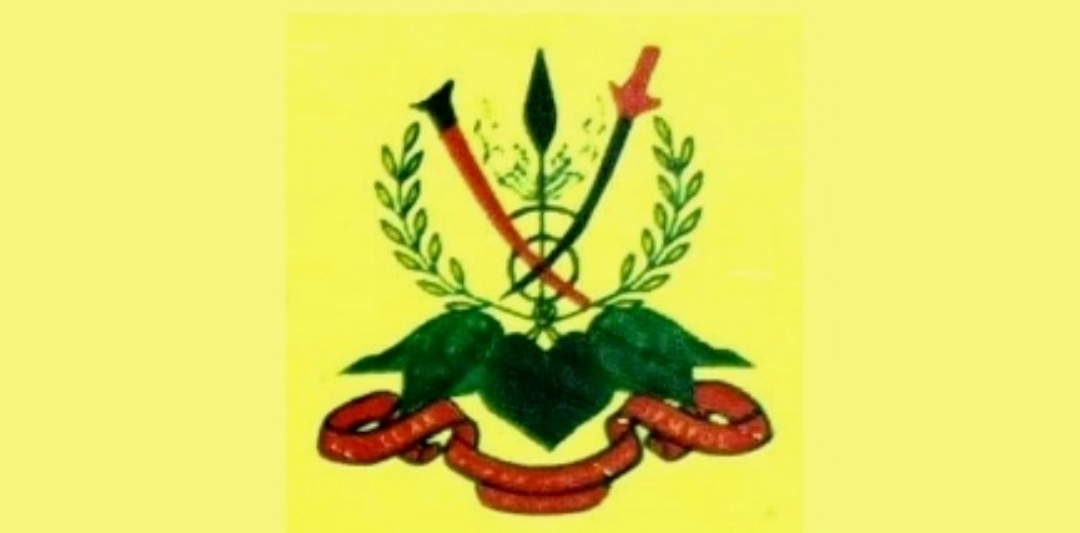
Jempol

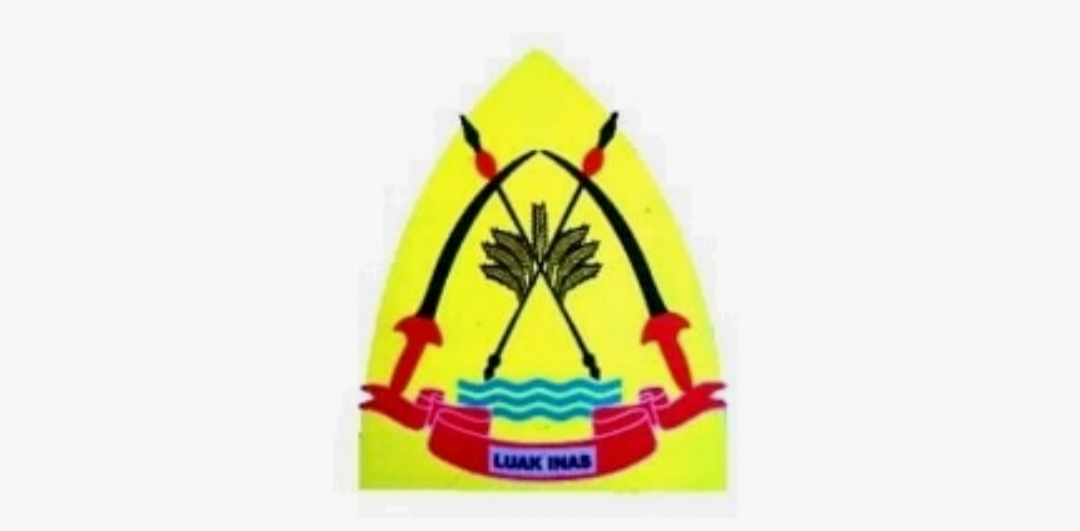
Ineh

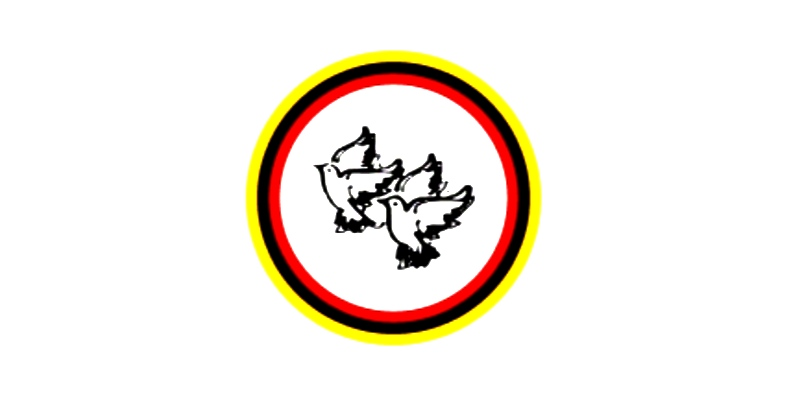
Ulu Muar

Tampin

=== Local flags ===
Flags of towns in Negeri Sembilan
Seremban

== Coat of arms ==
Coat of arms of Negeri Sembilan
- Armiger: Negeri Sembilan
- Crest: A spear (Changgai Puteri) Argent points upwards in pale surmounted by a sword and its sheath point downwards in saltire Gules.
- Shield: Tierced per bend Gules, Sable and Or, overall a plume of nine paddy stalks proper surmounted by a riband Argent on the riband the words Negeri Sembilan in Jawi script Sable; in base an enneagram Sable.
- Motto: Negeri Sembilan (نڬري سمبيلن) in Jawi Script

The Negeri Sembilan coat of arms is based on Western heraldry, but consists of only two heraldic elements: The shield (escutcheon) and crest or helm; the motto of the Negeri Sembilan arms, normally included on the bottom as a scroll on the majority of Malaysia's coats of arms, is embedded into the shield of the arms. Like the flag, the Negeri Sembilan coat of arms utilises the colours black, red and yellow with the minor addition of white.

Escutcheon
The escutcheon of the arms is depicted as an Old French shield outlined in black and white. The shield itself is coloured in shades of the Minangkabau people's traditional colours, like the flag, but is illustrated in the form of three partitions separated by diagonal lines running from the upper left to the lower right and varies slightly by its symbolisation. The colours signify the following:
- the yellow as the Yang Di-Pertuan Besar of Negeri Sembilan;
- the black as the four Undangs (with the addition of the Tunku Besar of Tampin); and
- the red as past relations with the British.
Further adorning the shield are nine yellow stalks of rice attached to the motto in the form a white scroll with "Negeri Sembilan" written in Jawi scripture (نڬري سمبيلن), with a nine-pointed star below. The stalks signifies the nine states under the old Negeri Sembilan: Jelai, Jelebu, Johol, Kelang (now part of Selangor), Naning (now part of Malacca), Rembau, Segamat-Pasir Besar, Sungei Ujong, and Ulu Pahang. Similarly, the nine-pointed star symbolise the nine (original) states of Negeri Sembilan united as one.

Crest or helm
The shield is topped by a crest or helm in the form of a white staff known as the Changgai Putri (or Changgai Puteri), which is fronted by a red sword and red scabbard. The staff represents the Yang Di-Pertuan Besar, while the sword and scabbard signify justice. Additionally, the staff and sword represent the Yang di-Pertuan Besar's personal Sceptre of Regalia since 1948.

=== City, district and municipal council emblems ===
All 7 local governments in Negeri Sembilan have their own emblem, which evolved in design throughout history. Each design may reflect a municipality's identities and or the roles and responsibilities of its local authority. The District Councils of Jelebu, Kuala Pilah and Tampin as well as the Municipal Council of Jempol feature the Minangkabau Roof in their emblem. Both emblems of Jempol Municipal Council and the Rembau District Council consist of mainly stylised abbreviation of their names. The emblem of Seremban City Council (below) features two krises between a shield, while the Port Dickson Municipal Council emblem displays ship's wheel, sailboat, buildings, birds and sea waves. Only one local authority – Kuala Pilah District Council incorporated the State Coat of Arms into its emblem.

Emblem of Seremban City Council
