= Warong Nasi Pariaman =

Street food stall in Singapore

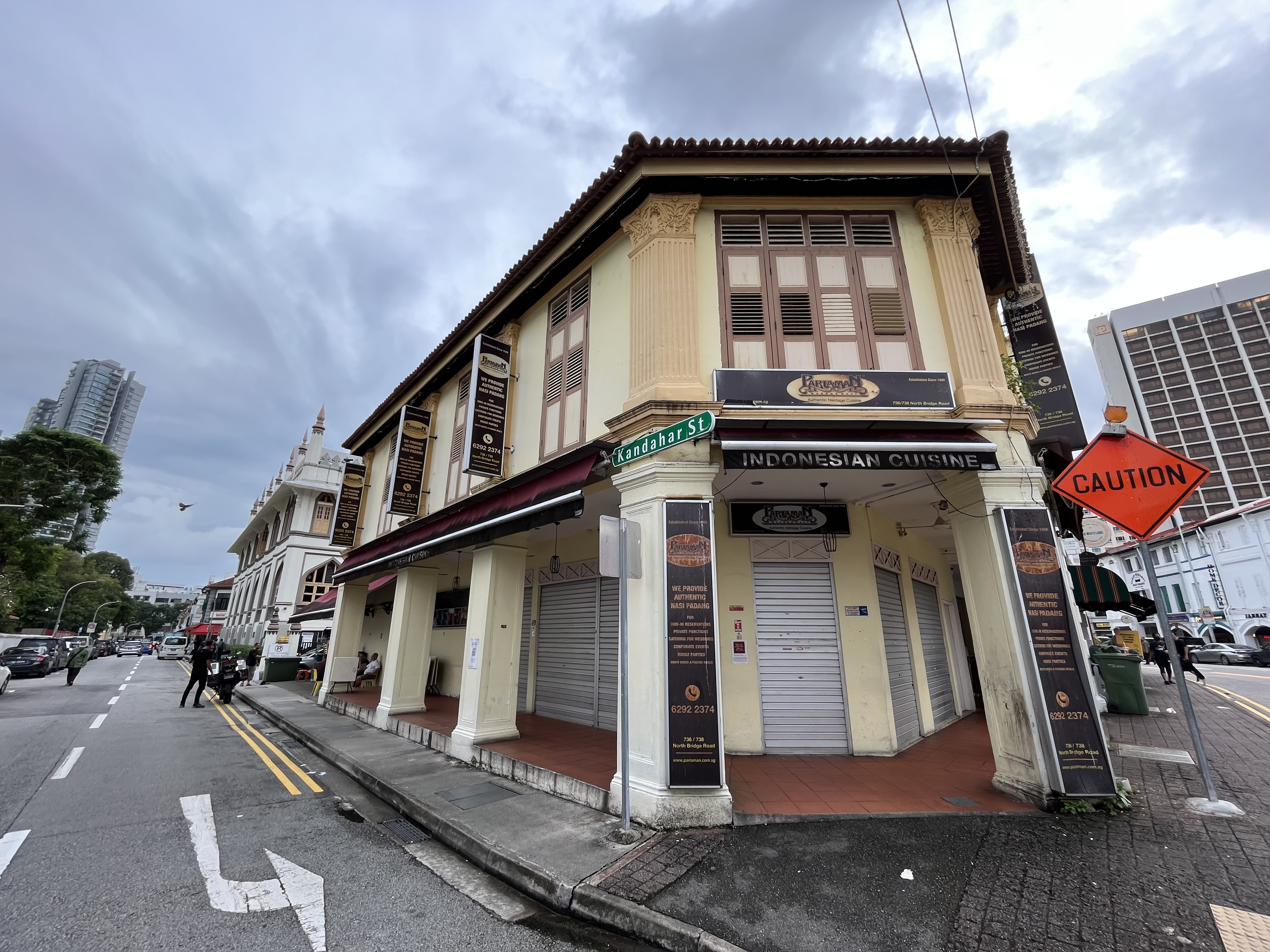
- Interactive map of Warong Nasi Pariaman

Restaurant information
- Established: 1948; 78 years ago
- Closed: 31 January 2026; 7 months ago
- Head chef: Jumrin Isrin
- Food type: Indonesian
- Location: 738 North Bridge Road, 198706, Singapore
- Coordinates: 1.302861°N 103.859231°E

Warong Nasi Pariaman was an eatery along North Bridge Road and Kandahar Street in Singapore. At the time of its closure, the restaurant was believed to be the oldest surviving stall selling nasi padang in Singapore. The business announced on 22 January 2026 that it would close down at the end of that month.

== History ==
The eatery was founded in 1948 by Haji Isrin from Pariaman at the corner of North Bridge Road and Kandahar Street. After Haji retired, the business went to his wife, Hajah Rosnah. In 1988, the business went to their sons Sudirman, Jumrin and Abdul, and their wives. However, Sudirman, who had been heading the team, later left.

In 2021, the National Heritage Board designated the eatery as a "mini-museum". This was done in an effort to raise awareness to smaller business with a long history and were often overlooked.

== Reception ==
Anette Tan of the Condé Nast Traveler included the restaurant in her list of the 28 Best Restaurants in Singapore in 2019. In 2016, it was awarded the Heritage Heroes Award for preserving local culinary traditions.
