= Alauddin Ri'ayat Syah Sayyid al-Mukammal =

Sultan of Aceh (1589–1604)

Alauddin Riayat Shah Sayyid Al-Mukammil علاء الدين رعاية شاه السيد المكمل
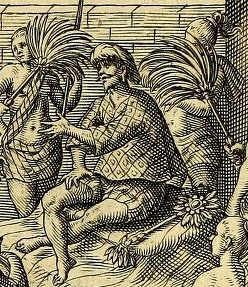
- Alauddin Ri'ayat Syah, surrounded by his female guards depicted by Theodor de Bry, 1604 engraving

Sultan of Aceh Sultanate
- Reign: 28 June 1589–1605
- Predecessor: Sultan Buyung
- Successor: Ali Ri'ayat Syah III
- Born: Banda Aceh, Aceh Sultanate
- Died: 1605; Banda Aceh, Aceh Sultanate
- Issue: Maharaja Diraja; Ali Ri'ayat Syah III; Sultan Husain; Sultan Abangta Merah Upah; Raja Puteri; Puteri Raja Inderabangsa
- Father: Almalik Firman Syah bin Muzaffar Syah

Sultan Alauddin Ri'ayat Syah Sayyid al-Mukammal (died 1605) was the tenth Sultan of Aceh in northern Sumatra, ruling from 1589 to 1604. His reign is important since it saw the arrival of three new European powers to the region of the Melaka Straits: the Dutch, English and French.

== Rise to power ==
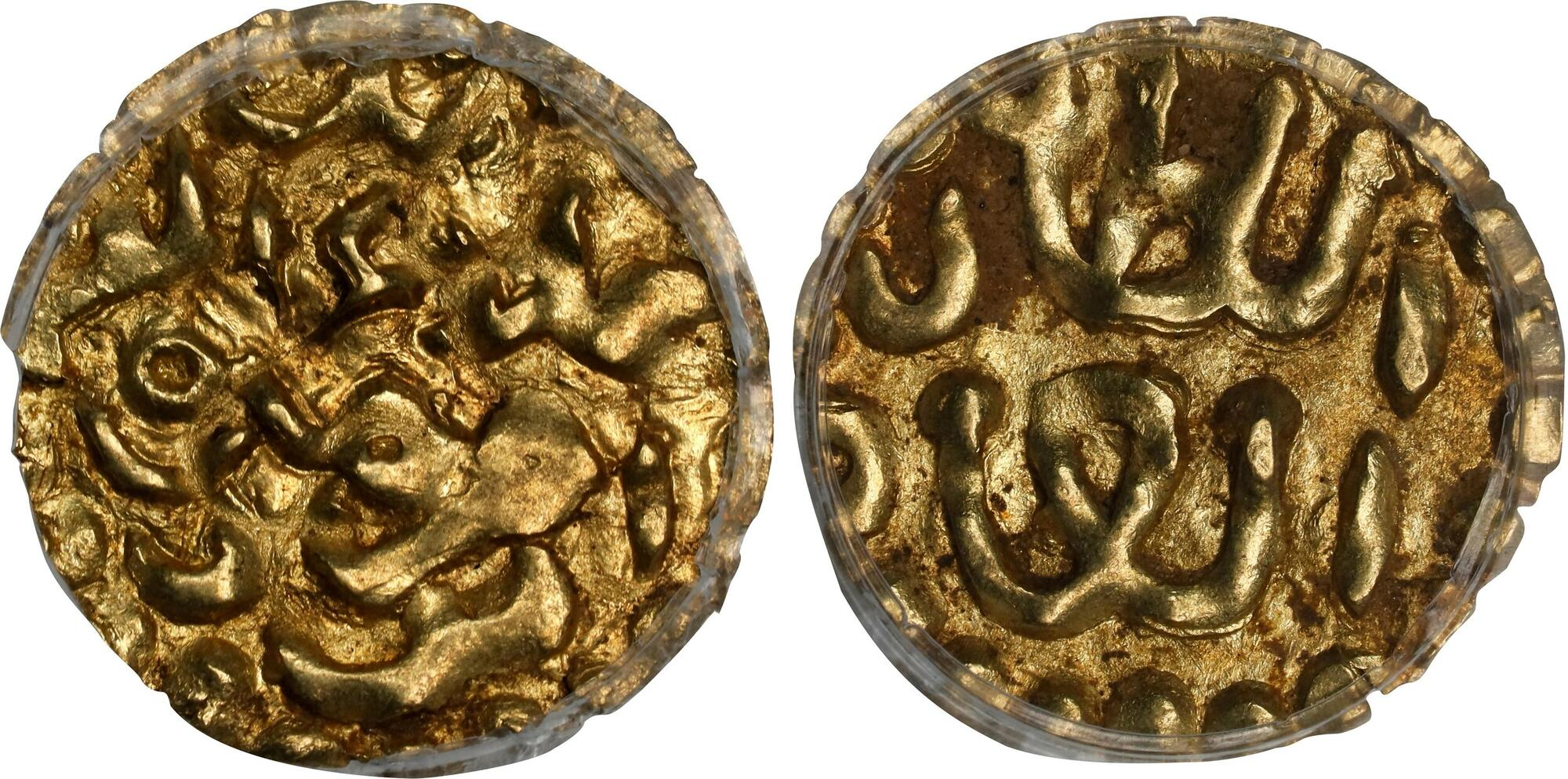
A coin from Aceh during the reign of Sultan Alauddin Ri'ayat Syah Sayyid al-Mukammal.

Sultan Alauddin was reportedly a descendant of the old rajas who governed in Aceh in the fifteenth century. His father was Almalik Firman Syah, a son of Muzaffar Syah (d. 1497). This branch seems to have been entirely obscured by the lineage of Ali Mughayat Syah. In his youth he was a fisherman but rose in the ranks of the kingdom due to his valour and military prowess, becoming a military commander. He allegedly murdered Sultan Alauddin Mansur Syah in 1585/86 but acted as the protector of the sultan's young grandson Raja Asyem. Whether he was also responsible for the murder of Sultan Buyung in 1589 is not clear. At any rate he was enthroned under the name Sultan Alauddin Ri'ayat Syah and also known as Sayyid al-Mukammal. In order to eliminate a possible future rival he murdered Raja Asyem. He therefore provoked the hostility of Johor on the Malay Peninsula, since the boy's father was the sultan of that place.

In spite of the murky circumstances of his rise, the chronicle Hikayat Aceh praises Sultan Alauddin as righteous and pious, and characterizes his reign as prosperous. A Frenchman who visited Aceh in 1601–03 noted the dynamic international flavour of his reign: "In the streets are a large number of ships belonging to merchants dressed in the Turkish style who come from the great lands of Negapatnam, Gujarat, Cape Comorin, Calicut, the island of Ceylon, Siam, Bengal and various other places. They live in this place for some six months in order to sell their merchandise that consists of very fine cotton cloth from Gujarat, sturdy silk bolts and other textiles of cotton thread, various types of porcelain, a large number of drugs, spices, and precious stones."

== Affairs with the Malay states ==
However, Aru on the east coast, precursor of the later Deli sultanate, rebelled after a while, supported by Johor. According to the chronicles Sultan Alauddin ordered the Arunese to build a ship for him. Their tardiness to fulfill this triggered a conflict, and Aru offered the sultan of Johor to become their lord (before 1599). When Sultan Alauddin was informed of this, he dispatched a fleet to chastise Aru, but it was beaten back. The sultan now led a second armada in person. This time Aru was conquered and the Johor sultan expelled, but at the cost of his son-in-law Mansur (father of the later sultan Iskandar Muda) who was killed in the battle. He then crossed the Straits with his ships and besieged Johor. Since many of his men fell in the enterprise he eventually gave up the attempt and returned Aceh.

== Arrival of the Dutch ==
Dutch, English and French ships began to arrive in the area during Sultan Alauddin's reign. This created a new strategic situation since these seafaring nations were rivals to the Portuguese with whom Aceh momentarily lived in an uneasy state of peace. The Dutch commander Cornelis de Houtman arrived to Aceh in June 1599. The communication between the Dutch and the court were initially friendly, but Portuguese intrigues caused the Acehnese to attack the ships. Although they were eventually pushed back, De Houtman was killed and his brother Frederik de Houtman was captured. In November 1600 the commander Van Caerden arrived with two ships and was friendly received by Sultan Alauddin. Some of the Dutch prisoners were released while others escaped and reached Van Caerden's ships. However, Van Caerden suspected that the Acehnese planned something, and confiscated all the pepper in the harbour. The Acehnese opened fire and Van Caerden left the port after having burnt a Portuguese and some other vessels.

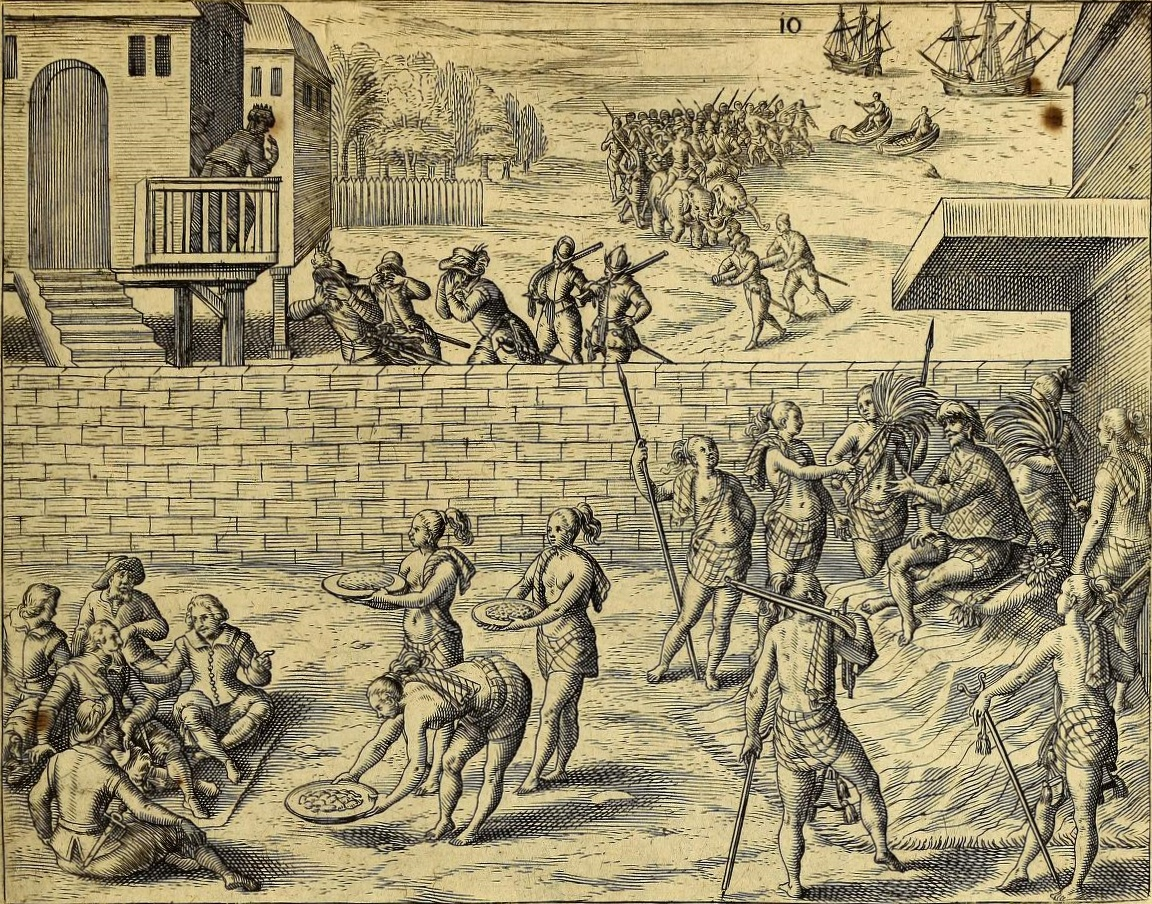
Reception of the Dutch at the court of Aceh, 1601.

The sultan's friendship with the Portuguese cooled when they asked for permission to build a fort at the estuary of the Aceh River. This was refused. In the next year 1601, an acute dispute arose. One of the Portuguese ships chased an Arab craft and was therefore in turn attacked and taken by Acehnese vessels. This incident may explain the good reception accorded to a new Dutch fleet that reached Aceh in August 1601. Being enemies of the Portuguese they were probably seen as a useful counterweight. Sultan Alauddin gave permit to the strangers to establish a trading post. Two envoys were dispatched for the Netherlands. One of them died in Middelburg but the other negotiated with Prince Maurits of Nassau. He was eventually brought back to Aceh with a Dutch craft in December 1604. At that time Sultan Alauddin was no longer on the throne. English and French ships visited Aceh in 1602. The naval prowess of the new Europeans was demonstrated when a large Portuguese galleon was captured by a Dutch-English fleet. They joyful sultan reportedly showed his gratitude by singing a psalm of David.

== End of the reign ==
The reign of Sultan Alauddin marked the beginning of an era of centralization of the kingdom. The sultan suppressed the mercantile elite, the orang kayas, who had gained undue influence in succession affairs in the period 1579–89, killing many of them and preventing them from asserting power. In this he was strongly supported by the local qadi. His use of power symbols is seen from his cap (seal) from 1601, which reads: "Sultan Alauddin ibn Firman Syah; he who puts faith in God, who has chosen him to hold kingdoms and is pleased with him, Allah makes his glory endure and helps all his followers". Dissent rather came from within the sultan's family. Alauddin was deposed in April 1604 at an advanced age. Alternatively he is said to have abdicated of free will since he became ill. He died a year later. He was succeeded by his second son Sultan Muda alias Ali Ri'ayat Syah III, although there was reportedly an opinion to enthrone his strong-willed grandson Iskandar Muda. He had four sons and two daughters:

- Maharaja Diraja, d. before his father
- Ali Ri'ayat Syah III
- Sultan Husain, vassal ruler of Pidië
- Sultan Abangta Merah Upah, d. before his father
- Raja Puteri (daughter)
- Puteri Raja Inderabangsa (daughter), married Mansur Syah, mother of Iskandar Muda

== See also ==
- Acehnese-Portuguese conflicts

== Literature ==
- Andaya, Leonard Y. (2010) Leaves of the Same Tree: Trade and Ethnicity in the Straits of Melaka. Singapore: NUS Press.
- Djajadiningrat, Raden Hoesein (1911) 'Critisch overzicht van de in Maleische werken vervatte gegevens over de geschiedenis van het soeltanaat van Atjeh', Bijdragen tot de Taal-, Land- en Volkenkunde 65, pp. 135–265.
- Encyclopaedie van Nederlandsch Indië, Vol. 1 (1917). 's Gravenhage & Leiden: Nijhoff & Brill.
- Hadi, Amirul (2004) Islam and State in Sumatra: A Study of Seventeenth-Century Aceh. Leiden: Brill.
- Iskandar, Teuku (1958) De Hikajat Atjeh. 's Gravenhage: M. Nijhoff.

Preceded by Sultan Buyung	Sultan of Aceh Sultanate; 28 June 1589 – 1605	Succeeded by Ali Ri'ayat Syah III
