= Ali Ri'ayat Syah III =

Sultan of Aceh Sultanate
- Reign: 1604 – 4 April 1607
- Predecessor: Alauddin Ri'ayat Syah Sayyid al-Mukammal
- Successor: Iskandar Muda
- Born: Banda Aceh, Aceh Sultanate
- Died: 4 April 1607; Banda Aceh, Aceh Sultanate
- Father: Alauddin Ri'ayat Syah Sayyid al-Mukammal

Sultan Ali Ri'ayat Syah III (died 4 April 1607) was the eleventh Sulṭān of Acèh Darussalam in northern Sumatra. He had a brief and turbulent reign from 1604 to 1607 before being succeeded by his more famous nephew Iskandar Muda.

== Dynastic trouble ==
Sultan Muda, the future Sultan Ali, was the second son of Sultan Alauddin Ri'ayat Syah Sayyid al-Mukammal. In the early 17th century, he was made co-regent to his aged father. In April 1604 the old sultan was deposed and Sultan Muda was enthroned under the throne name Sultan Ali Ri'ayat Syah. His brief reign was marked by a severe drought which caused famine and death to many people. Moreover, dynastic instability afflicted the kingdom. In 1605 he picked up a fight with his brother Husain, vassal raja of Pidië. Sultan Ali's and Husain's nephew Perkasa Alam, the later Sultan Iskandar Muda, had been punished by the sultan and therefore fled to Pidië. Sultan Ali demanded his extradition but Husain refused. Husain came in open rebellion and ordered his nephew to lead the Pidië troops in a campaign against the capital, but in the end, the soldiers plainly refused to fight. Perkasa Alam was therefore captured and brought back to Kutaraja where he was confined to prison.

== Portuguese attack and the demise of Sultan Ali ==
The Portuguese authorities were concerned that Aceh allowed trade with the Dutch East India Company and wished to erect a fortress at the strategically vital estuary of the Aceh River. a fleet was launched under the Viceroy Martim Afonso de Castro reaching there in June 1606. After negotiations with the sultan had failed the invaders attacked. Perkasa Alam asked the sultan to lead the army, his request was granted; In the following battle, the Portuguese attack was halted. De Castro probably heard of a strong Dutch and Johorese force that had attacked Melaka and therefore canceled the invasion. Due to his military feat Perkasa Alam came in high esteem at the court. His mother Puteri Raja Inderabangsa, the sultan's sister, prepared the way for his rise by distributing money to the mercantile elite, the orang kayas. When Sultan Ali suddenly died on 4 April 1607, Perkasa Alam secured the loyalty of the palace guards by generous gifts, gave the officers attractive promises, and threatened the qadi who opposed his enthronement. On the same day as his uncle died he was, therefore, able to ascend the throne, taking the name Iskandar Muda. Under him Aceh would reach its political apogee.

== Literature ==
- Djajadiningrat, Raden Hoesein (1911) 'Critisch overzicht van de in Maleische werken vervatte gegevens over de geschiedenis van het soeltanaat van Atjeh', Bijdragen tot de Taal-, Land- en Volkenkunde 65, pp. 135–265.
- Encyclopaedie van Nederlandsch Indië, Vol. 1 (1917). 's Gravenhage & Leiden: Nijhoff & Brill.
- Hadi, Amirul (2004) Islam and State in Sumatra: A Study of Seventeenth-Century Aceh. Leiden: Brill.
- Penth, Hans (1969) Hikajat Atjeh: Die Erzählung von der Abkunft und den Jugendjaren des Sultan Iskandar Muda von Atjeh (Sumatra). Wiesbaden: Otto Harrassowitz.

Preceded by Alauddin Ri'ayat Syah Sayyid al-Mukammal	Sultan of Aceh Sultanate; 1604 – 4 April 1607	Succeeded by Iskandar Muda
