= Jambu Lipo Kingdom =

Former kingdom in Indonesia

The Jambu Lipo Kingdom is a former kingdom located in Lubuk Tarok, Sijunjung Regency, West Sumatra. According to Tambo Minangkabau, the name Jambu Lipo came from the result of an agreement between Rajo Tigo Selo in Pagaruyung which stipulated that they should not forget each other, with the origin of the word jan bu lupo meaning 'don't forget mother'.

== History ==
The Jambu Lipo Kingdom is a branch of the Pagaruyung Kingdom. According to Tambo Minangkabau, this kingdom was founded in the early 10th century by the pious congregation of the Islamic syiar caliph from Samudera Pasai with its first king having the title Dungku Dangka. The government structure of the Jambu Lipo Kingdom is the same as the Pagaruyung Kingdom used by Rajo Tigo Selo. At first the center of government of the Jambu Lipo Kingdom was in Jambu Lipo Hill. During the reign of the 4th king, Buayo Kumbang, together with other dignitaries, held negotiations against the White Memories conflict in which it was agreed to move the center of government to Nagari Lubuk Tarok. Jambulipo Kingdom was originally centered on the top of the Jambulipo Hill, about 3 km from the Lubuk Tarok highway. The first king to hold the reins of government was Dungku Dangka, who was succeeded by 14 kings. The last king was Firman, with the title of the 14th Bagindo Tan Ameh. The existence of the Jambulipo kingdom at the top of Jambulipo Hill only lasted until the reign of the 4th king, namely, Rajo Alam, who had the title Bagindo Tan Ameh. After carrying out regional developments to various regions including Nagari Paulasan, Taratak Baru, and Sinyamu, the Jambu Lipo Kingdom accepted peace talks from Sutan Nan Paik's side at Koto Tinggi. The negotiations then continued to create a nagari which is now known as Nagari Lubuk Tarok. Since the establishment of Nagari Lubuk Tarok, the Jambu Lipo Kingdom is no longer at the top of the Jambu Lipo Hill, but is instead centered in the Gadang Bawah Pawuah House (otherwise known as Kelambu Suto). The structure of government in the Jambu Lipo Kingdom is still well-preserved as before with the top leadership of Rajo Tigo Selo, namely: Rajo Alam with the title Bagindo Tan Ameh, Rajo Ibadat with the title Bagindo Maharajo Indo, and Rajo Adat with the title Bagindo Tan Putih. Besides Rajo Nan Tigo Selo, there are several core royal officials consisting of Royal Sandi, Amanah Sandi, and Padek Sandi as well as several commanders called Ampang Limo Rajo. The above officials also have their respective subordinates, both at the central and regional levels.

=== The existence of the Jambu Lipo Kingdom in Sijunjung ===
Based on collective memory and traditions that are still sustainable in the Kanagarian community, a research team led by Lubuk Tarok Dra. Zusneli Zubir, M. Hum. reported the results of their study of the existence of the Jambu Lipo Kingdom at the Seminar on the Results of the Study of Cultural Values, held by the Center for the Preservation of Cultural Values of the province of West Sumatra (BPNB West Sumatra) in November 2020. Zusneli Zubir and the team reported the results of a study entitled 'The Existence of the Royal Tradition of Jambu Lipo in Community Development in Sijunjung Regency (1980 – 2000)'.. Their study was dissected by Dr. Nopriyasman, M. Hum., Chair of the Postgraduate History of Andalas University in front of 30 seminar participants who enthusiastically responded to the research. Zusneli Zubir said, "The existence of the Jambu Lipo Kingdom to this day is still visible in the level of ceremonies, the beauty and majesty of the cultural relics, the arts that are performed, as well as the natural environment of the royal area. related to the existence of the Jambu Lipo Kingdom, among others, are events: mangroves (a thanksgiving ceremony), pilgrimage to Rajo's grave, and wandering overseas.” Currently, there has been a fusion between modernity and traditionality, which is in line with the local government's efforts to make cultural historical heritage a valuable asset to support tourism in the region. In this context, the cultural heritage of the Jambu Lipo Kingdom appears as a mainstay for the prosperity of the country. Zusneli Zubir also said that the emergence of the royal world as one of the Minangkabau identities was related to Governor of West Sumatra Harun Al Rasyid Zein's strategy in bringing back Minangkabau culture which was symbolized through the construction of the Basa Palace. Palaces and all forms of royal heritage are meant to become symbols of the excellence of regional identity in Indonesia in the era of autonomy.

== Royal tradition ==
The culture of a community group is formed by ancestral traditions that are passed down from generation to generation. The same is the case with the Sekala Brak Kingdom. Even though in its development there is cultural assimilation, the tradition that is maintained will become a separate character as a potential that can be utilized for welfare for generations. As in Sijunjung Regency, West Sumatra, the traditions of the Jambu Lipo Kingdom are still entrenched for generations. part of the community. The tradition of the Jambu Lipo Kingdom, the existence of the king is still being preserved, known as Rajo Tigo Selo, which consists of Rajo Alam, Rajo Adat, and Rajo Ibadat. The preservation of the Jambu Lipo Kingdom does not mean the king over the country, but it is related to culture and culture, so it is not administratively. According to the History researcher from the Center for the Preservation of Cultural Values of West Sumatra "Zusneli" in the historical study of the Kingdom of Jambu Lipo, it used to have an area of authority, covering the area which is now named Sijunjung Regency, South Solok Regency, and Dharmasraya Regency. Zusneli also said, "To conduct this research I was supported by two members, Efrianto and Rismadona. While in Sijunjung Regency, we held an audience with the Deputy Regent, Regional Secretary, Head of the Education and Culture Office, Head of Archives and Library Office, Head of LKAAM, Rajo Alam, Rajo Ibadah, Walinagari Lubuak Tarok, and local community leaders." There are several traditions of the Jambu Lipo Kingdom that are still entrenched in the community. One of them, the tradition of 'walking overseas' which is held once every two years by Rajo Ibadat. "The preservation of this tradition consists of gathering activities, coronation of traditional shoots, resolving disputes in overseas areas, Islamic da'wah, and treatment. The remains of the Jambu Lipo Kingdom include; Istano, Keris (Sokin, Soka Daguk), Golden Sword, Jogi Spear, Pending Emas, Destar, 12 pieces of beard tweezers, Shakes, Bintang (rice bowl), Carano and Talam.
