= Dubalang =

Local ethnic group of West Sumatran security guards

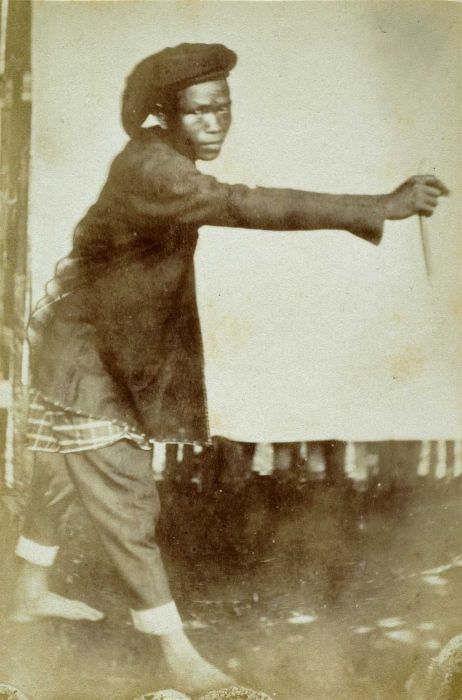
"Portrait of a village policeman in action" by Daniël David Veth (circa 1878)

Dubalang is an institution of security guards in the traditional social system of the Minangkabau people. They are charged with maintaining the tranquility of the clan, village, and nagari.

Dubalang are Bagak (brave), which became one of the elements of the traditional system in a large family or clan, under the Datuk (Muslim leader) who serves as the main leader, the Imam or Katib who works in the field of religion, and the Manti who helped the Datuk in terms of governance. Dubalang also serve as enforcers and guards of village peace and security called Dubalang Parik Paga (Dubalang Moat Fence).

Dubalang carry out duties and functions in accordance with the rules of traditional Minangkabau. To carry out its duties, dubalang follow a set of principles. They were involved in the struggle against colonialism. They are instrumental in maintaining and enforcing the rules and customs in their area. In the war for independence, dubalang led in some villages because they are a group that knows no fear, and dare to die in carrying out their duties.

A traditional institution, dubalang have almost no role in the contemporary social system of Minangkabau. They have been largely replaced by security agencies / state security in the form of police and municipal police. But lately a number of Minangkabau public figures feel very worried about the condition of the people that are considered to be in circumstances that are very troubling. Drugs, prostitution, and various other social ills have penetrated the joints of people's lives.

Starting from the circumstances that are considered intolerable, some Minangkabau community leaders, such as Dasrul Lamsudin and Mochtar Naim support the use of traditional institutions and community organizations, and call for the re-activation of the suspended role of the dubalang institution with the name of Barisan Dubalang Paga Nagari (Row of Dubalang Fence of the Nagari) or BDPN.
