= Pariaman =

City in West Sumatra, Indonesia

- City
- City of Pariaman; Kota Pariaman

Other transcription(s)
  - Jawi: ڤريامن
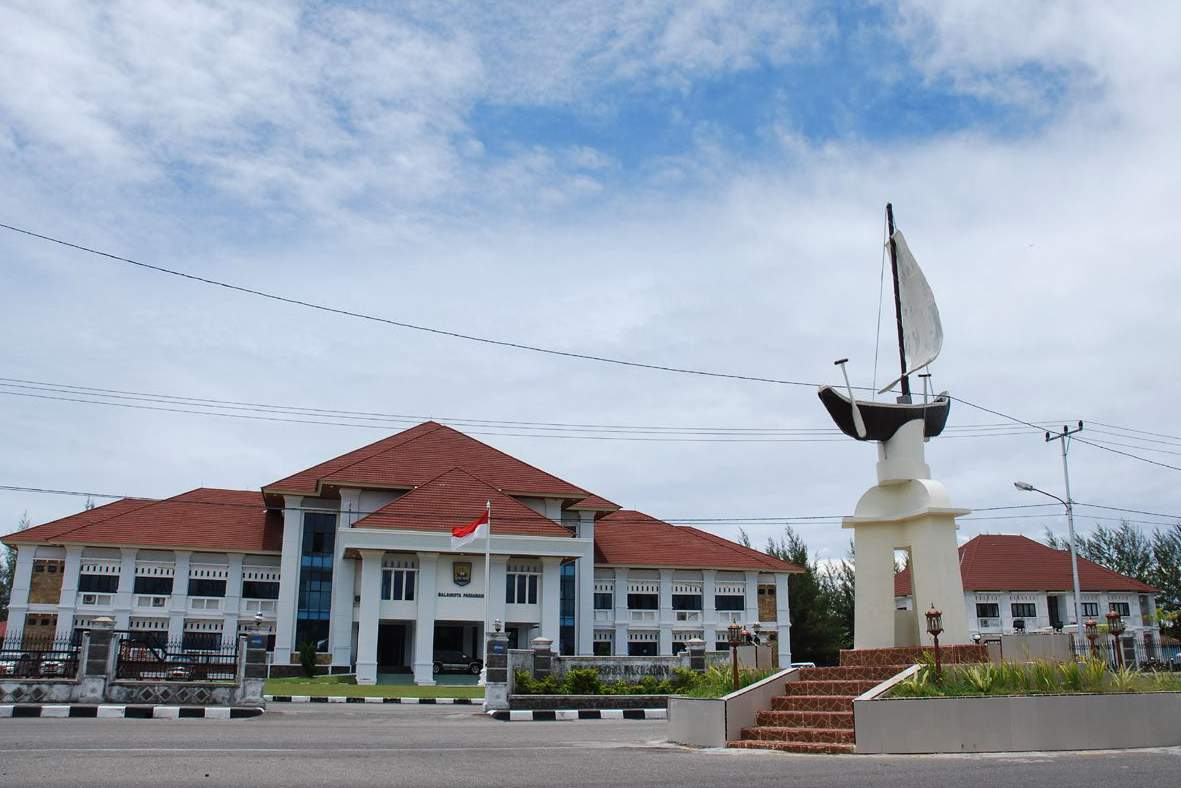
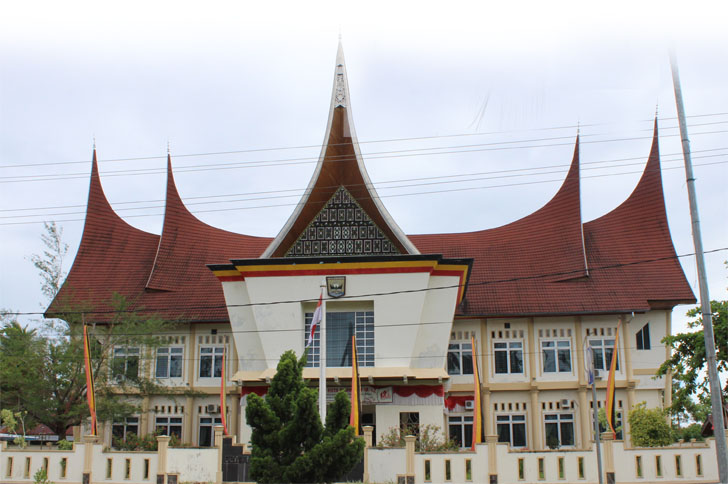
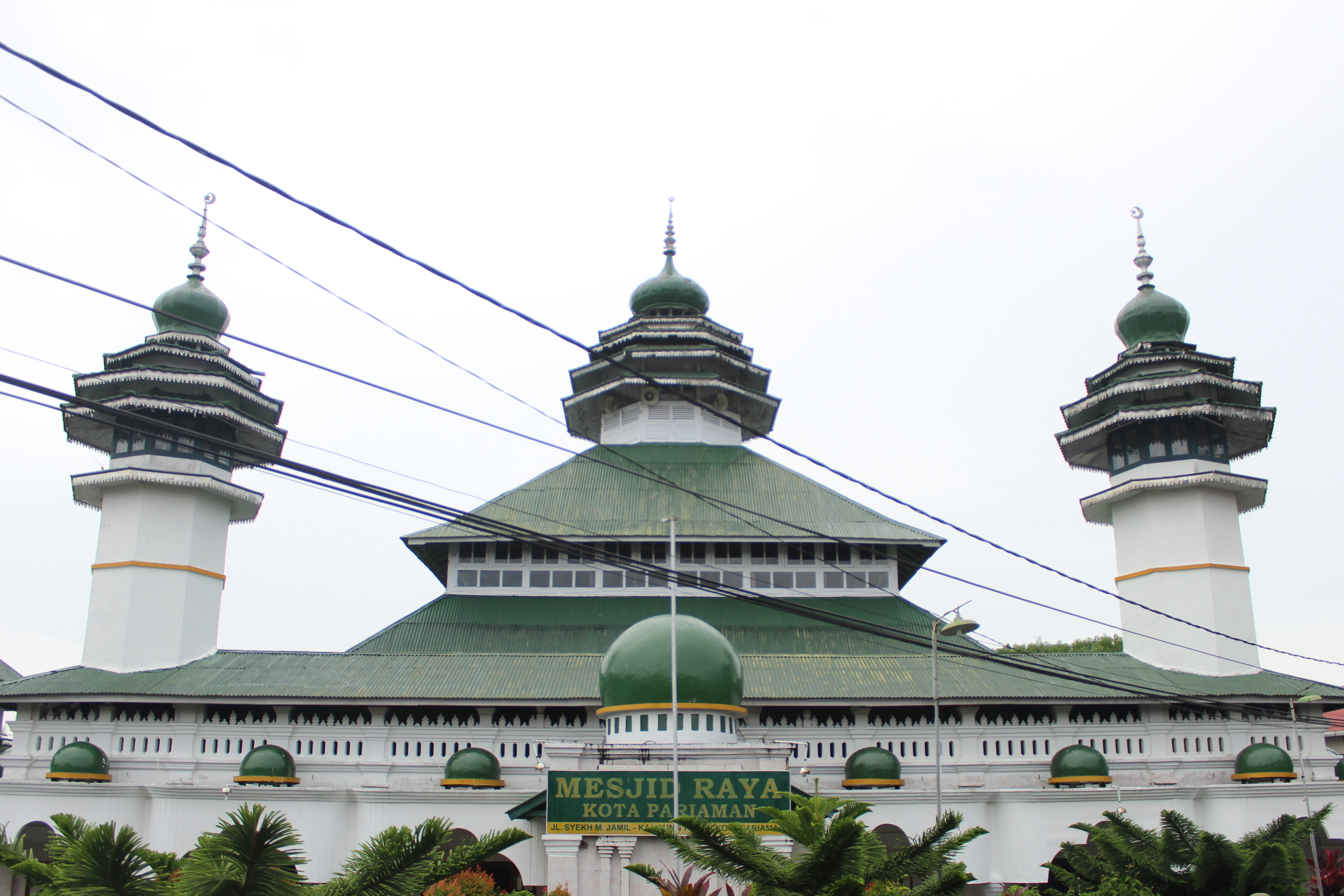
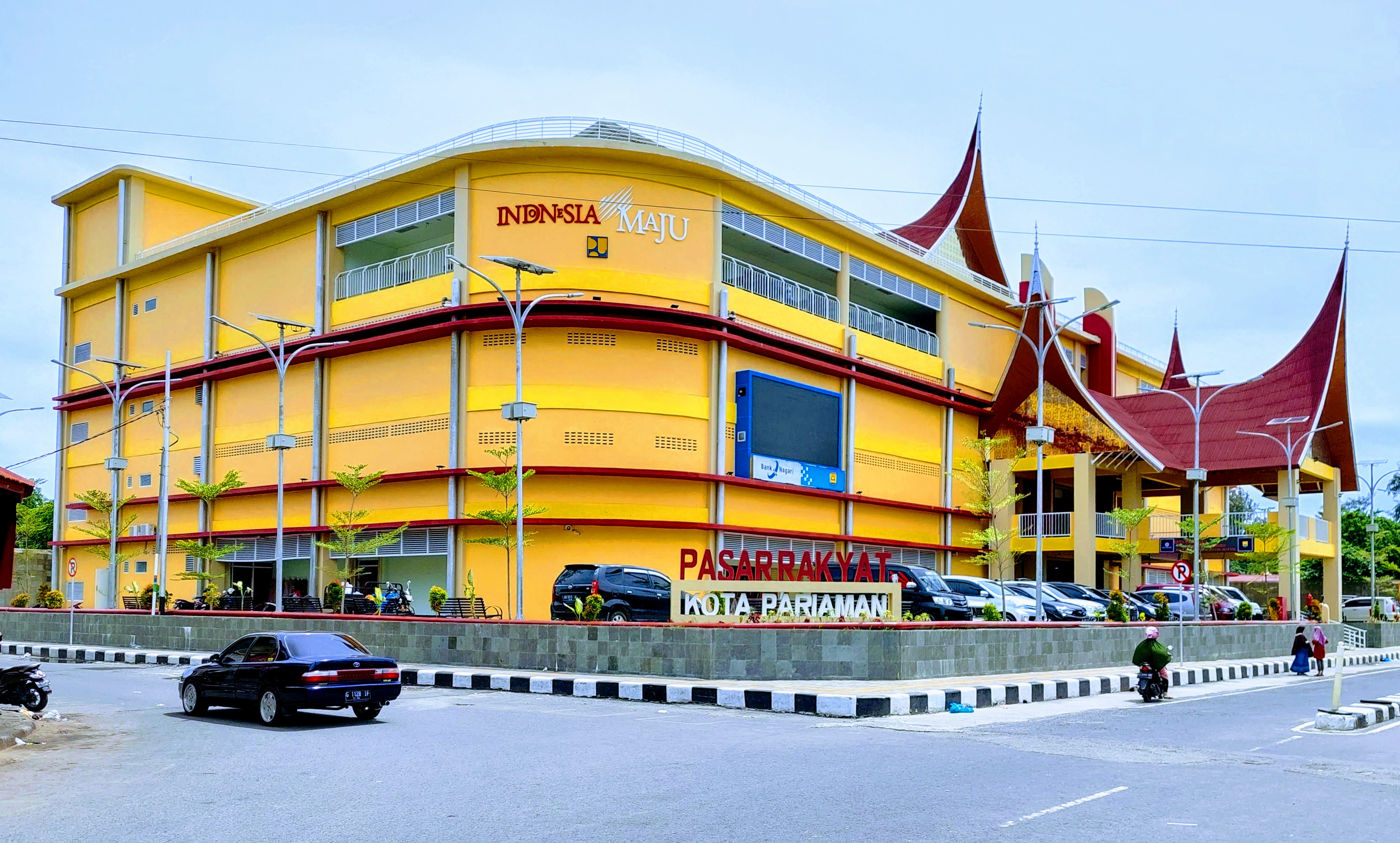
- Pariaman City Hall; Regional House of Representatives building; Great Mosque of Pariaman; Pariaman Public Market

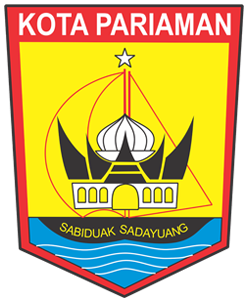
- Coat of arms
- Motto: Sabiduak Sadayuang (Together on one ship, together rowing it)
- Location within West Sumatra

- Location in Sumatra and Indonesia Pariaman (Indonesia)
- Coordinates: 0°37′35″S 100°7′4″E
- Country: Indonesia
- Province: West Sumatra

Government
  - Mayor: Yota Balad
  - Vice Mayor: Mulyadi

Area
  - Total: 64.97 km^{2} (25.09 sq mi)

Population (mid 2025 estimate)
  - Total: 104,970
  - Density: 1,616/km^{2} (4,185/sq mi)
- Time zone: UTC+7 (Indonesia Western Time)
- Area code: (+62) 751
- Website: pariamankota.go.id

Pariaman (Jawi: ڤريامن), is a coastal city in West Sumatra, Indonesia. Pariaman covers an area of 64.97 km^{2} (25 sq mi), with a 12 km (7 mi) coastline. It had a population of 79,043 at the 2010 Census and 94,224 at the 2020 census; the official estimate as of mid 2025 was 104,970 (comprising 53,130 males and 51,850 females). "Pariaman" means "safe area".

== History ==
According to the limited early sources available, by the sixteenth century Pariaman was an important port city serving the Minangkabau settlements in the interior highlands of central west Sumatra. Traders from western India and later from Europe visited the port, trading in pepper, gold, and other products of the interior. In the early seventeenth century the port came under control of the Sultanate of Aceh, to the north; an Acehnese governor was stationed in the town. The port formally came under Dutch control in 1663 by treaty with Aceh. In 1671 the Dutch built a lodge here and later, around 1684, a fort. Continuing clashes with local rulers and competition with other European trading companies resulted in the port being abandoned by the Dutch in 1770. By the early twentieth century the port was less prominent on the coast, as Padang, just to the south, was the focus of Dutch activities in western Sumatra and had a railroad link to the interior.

After Indonesian independence, Pariaman was a naval headquarters for a province called Central Sumatra. Originally part of Padang Pariaman Regency, it was separated administratively from the regency and became an autonomous city on 10 April 2002 under Law No. 12 of that year.

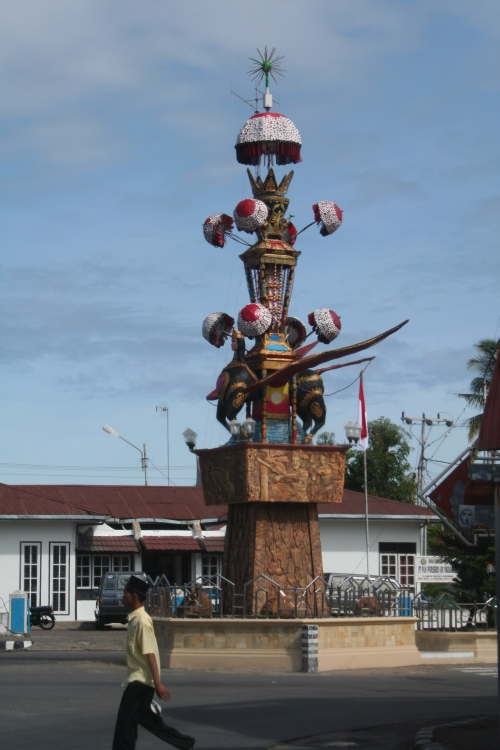
Tabuik monument

== Administrative districts ==
The city is administratively divided into four districts (kecamatan), listed below with their areas and their populations at the 2010 Census and 2020 Census, together with the official estimates as of mid 2025. The table also includes the locations of the district administrative centres and the numbers of administrative villages in each district (comprising 55 rural desa and 16 urban kelurahan - the latter all in Pariaman Tengah District).

Name of District (kecamatan)	Area in km^{2}	Pop'n 2010 Census	Pop'n 2020 Census	Pop'n mid 2025 Estimate	Admin centre	No. of villages
Pariaman Selatan (South Pariaman)	17.17	16,037	20,006	22,100	Kurai Taji	16
Pariaman Tengah (Central Pariaman)	11.64	28,957	31,930	35,260	Alai Gelombang	22
Pariaman Timur (East Pariaman)	16.78	14,853	19,697	21,420	Sungai Pasak	16
Pariaman Utara (North Pariaman)	19.38	19,196	22,591	26,200	Padang Birik-Birik	17
Totals	64.97	79,043	94,224	104,970	Alai Gelombang	71

The city is surrounded by the rural regency (kabupaten) of Padang Pariaman in the north, east, and south, while it borders with Mentawai Strait in the west, making Pariaman a semi-enclave within Padang Pariaman Regency.

== Economy ==
The contemporary economy is primarily agricultural with 79% of land in farming. Minangkabau International Airport, West Sumatra's major airport, is located near the city.

== Culture ==
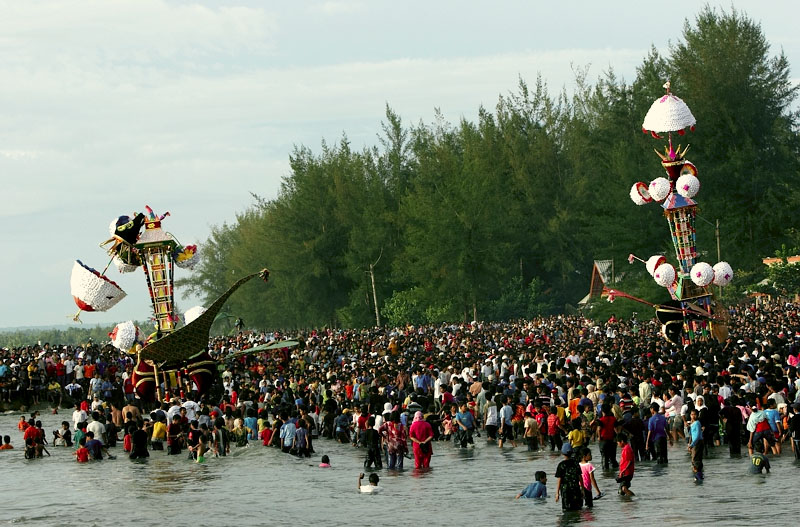
Tabuiks being lowered into the sea

Although the population of Pariaman is predominantly Sunni, a famous and popular festival of Shia origin named Tabuik (from Arabic "tabut" meaning coffin), is held annually in the city every 10 Muharram, the Day of Ashura. This practice was brought to the city in 1818, when ex-British soldiers from India settled in Pariaman. They had been disbanded when the British handed the area back to the Netherlands as part of the Anglo-Dutch Treaty of 1814.

The Tabuik festival commemorates the martyrdom of the grandsons of Muhammad, Hasan ibn Ali and Hussein ibn Ali. The Buraq, a purported winged horse that took Muhammad on his night-long journey to heavens, i.e., the Mi'raj, plays a role in the Tabuik. It presumably represents the white horse of the Imam Hussein at the Battle of Karbala, but is portrayed with a woman's head, wings, a broad tail and carrying a coffin.

In the festival, two such effigies or "Tabuik", one for Hasan and one for Hussein, are carried through the city. Named Tabuik Pasa and Tabuik Subarang, they are swayed accompanied by tambur music and tasa drums. In the afternoon, both Tabuik are moved to the coast and before sunset they are immersed into the sea.

== See also ==
- Warong Nasi Pariaman
