= Battle of Malacca =

The battle or siege of Malacca may refer to several historical battles that occurred in present-day Malacca, Malaysia:

- Capture of Malacca (1511), the Portuguese conquest of the Malacca Sultanate
- Demak invasions of Malacca
- Siege of Malacca (1551)
- Siege of Malacca (1568), Portugal repels an Acehnese siege
- Siege of Malacca (1573)
- Siege of Malacca (1574)
- Siege of Malacca (1575)
- Siege of Malacca (1606), Portugal repels Dutch and Johor forces
- Battle of Duyon River
- Siege of Malacca (1640–1641), the Dutch conquest of Portuguese Malacca
- Siege of Malacca (1756–1757)
- Siege of Malacca (1784), by the Johor and Selangor Sultanates
- Battle of the Malacca Strait (1945), the Royal Navy hunt down a Japanese cruiser
