= Siege of Malacca (1574) =

- Part of War of the League of the Indies
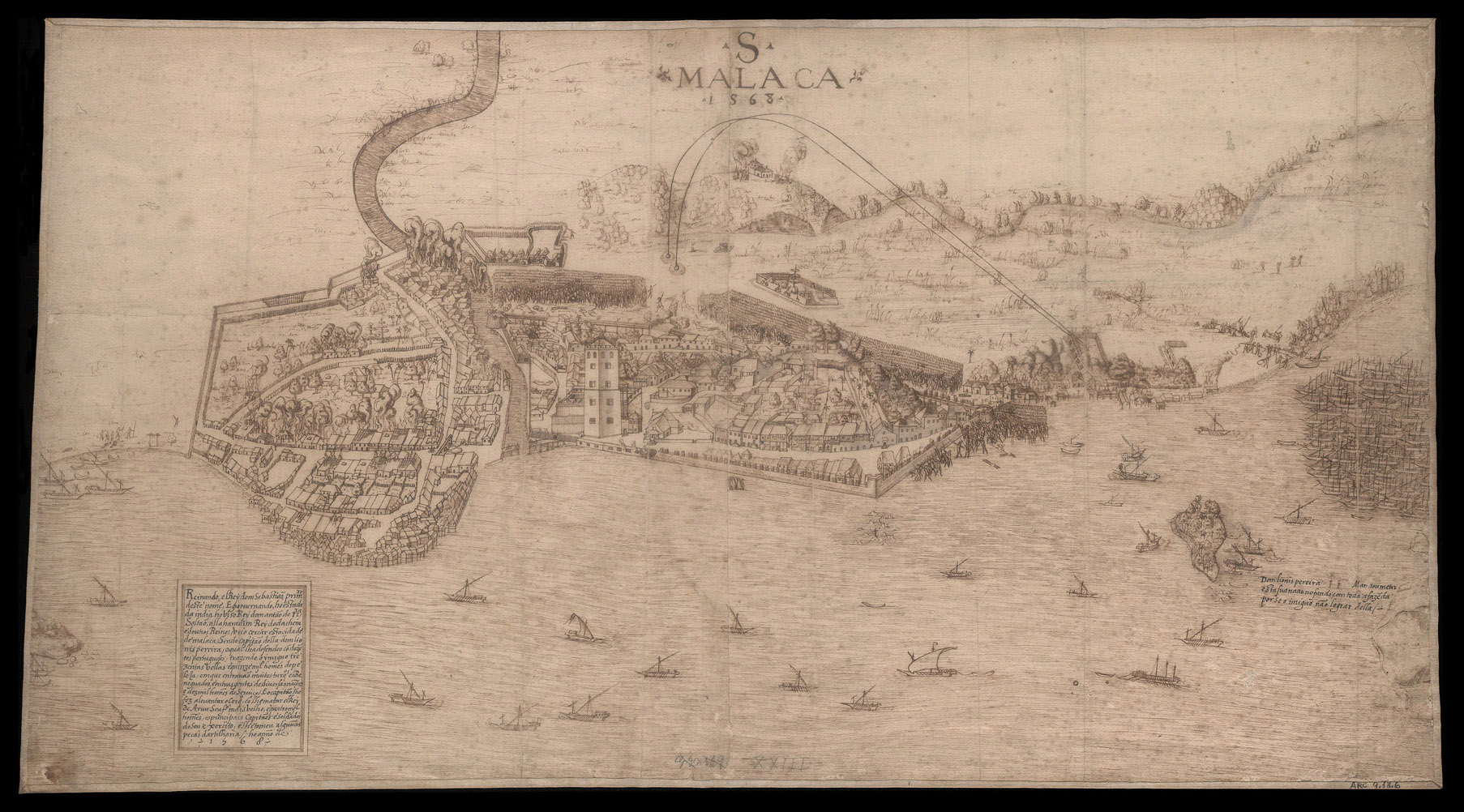
Date	October 5 – December 1574
Location	Malacca
Result	Portuguese victory

Belligerents
Portuguese Empire	Kalinyamat Sultanate

Commanders and leaders
Tristão Vaz da Veiga	Kyai Demang

Strength
300 soldiers	70–80 junks, 200 smaller vessels, 15,000 men

Casualties and losses
Low	~7,000 killed, nearly all ships lost

The Siege of Malacca (1574) was a military conflict between the Portuguese Empire and the Javanese under Queen Kalinyamat.

== Context ==
Despite the Aceh defeat Siege of Malacca (1573), the Queen of Kalinyamat organized an armada with which to attack Malacca, composed of over 70 to 80 junks and over 200 craft carrying 15,000 men under the command of Kyai Demang—transliterated as Queahidamão, Quilidamão or Quaidamand by the Portuguese— although with very little artillery and firearms. Malacca was defended by about 300 Portuguese.

By October 5, 1574, the armada anchored within the nearby River of Malaios and began landing troops, but the besiegers suffered Portuguese raids that caused great damage to the army when assembling stockades around the City.

== The Siege ==
As the captain of Malacca (on account of the sudden death of his predecessor), Tristão Vaz da Veiga decided to arm a small fleet of a galley and four half-galleys and about 100 soldiers and head out to the River of Malaios, in the middle of the night. Once there, the Portuguese fleet entered the river undetected by the Javanese crews, and resorting to hand-thrown fire bombs set fire to about thirty junks and other crafts, catching the enemy fleet entirely by surprise, and capturing ample supplies amidst the panicking Javanese. Kyai Demang afterwards decided to fortify the river mouth, constructing stockades across the river, armed with a few small cannon, but it too was twice destroyed by the Portuguese. Afterwards, Tristão Vaz da Veiga ordered Fernão Peres de Andrade to blockade the river mouth with a small carrack and a few oarships, trapping the enemy army within it and forcing the Javanese commander to come to terms with the Portuguese. Not coming to any agreement, in December Tristão Vaz finally ordered his forces to withdraw from the river mouth. The Javanese hastily embarked in the few ships they had left, overloading them, and sailed out of the river, only to be then preyed upon by Portuguese ships, who chased them down with their artillery.

== Aftermath ==
The Javanese lost almost all of their Junk (ship) and suffered about 7,000 dead at the end of the three-month campaign
