= Siege of Malacca (1573) =

1573 Invasion Of Malacca By Acehnese Ad Javanese

- Part of Acehnese–Portuguese conflicts; War of the League of the Indies
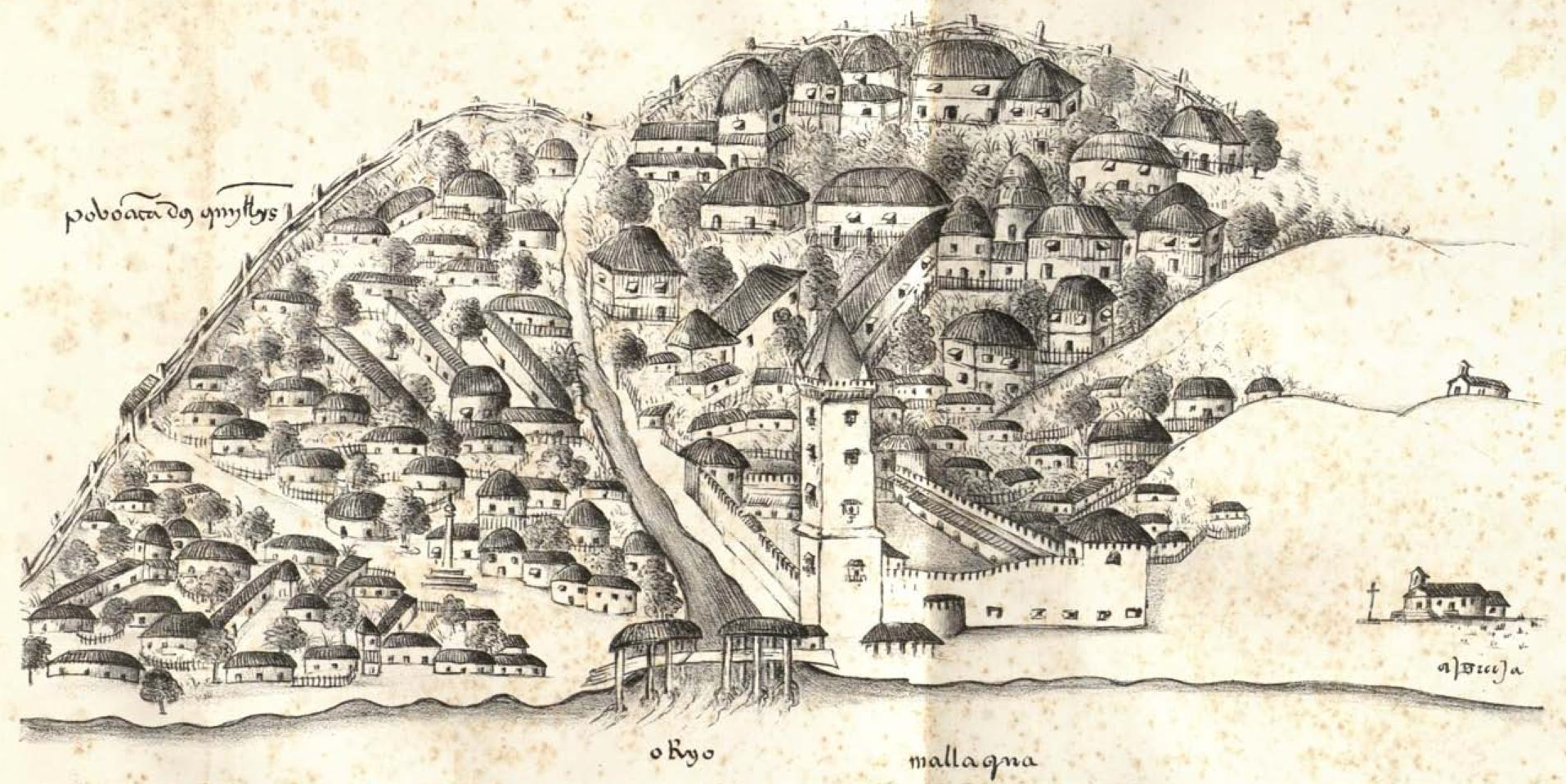
- Portuguese Malacca in 1550–1563
Date	October – November 1573
Location	Malacca, Portuguese Empire
Result	Portuguese victory

Belligerents
Kingdom of Portugal	(Aceh Sultanate) Sultanate of Aceh; Kalinyamat Sultanate

Commanders and leaders
Tristão Vaz de Veiga; Francisco Rodrigues	Ali Ri'ayat Syah I Ratu Kalinyamat

Strength
Unknown but very outnumbered	7,000 soldiers 25 galleys 34 half-galleys

Casualties and losses
Unknown	Very heavy

The siege of Malacca occurred in 1573, when the Sultan of Aceh attacked the Portuguese city of Malacca with the support of the Sultanate of Golconda and Kalinyamat. The Portuguese resisted the attack and the Muslim forces were routed.

By October 1573 Malacca was barely defended since most soldiers were embarked in commercial missions. The Sultan of Aceh gathered 7,000 men and a fleet of 25 galleys, 34 half-galleys, and 30 craft and requested assistance from the Queen of Kalinyamat to besiege it.

On October 13, the Acehnese force landed south of Malacca and dealt severe casualties to the Portuguese who attempted a sortie. After that, they began attacking the fortress with incendiary projectiles, causing several fires but a storm put them out and scattered the fleet, therefore the assault was called off. The Acehnese captain then decided to establish a naval base by the Muar River in order to force the city to surrender through a naval blockade, capturing any passing ships that could carry supplies to the city. An attempt to board a galleon and two carracks anchored by the Island of Naus was met with heavy resistance and suffered severe casualties from Portuguese gunfire.

On November 2, a carrack commanded by Tristão Vaz da Veiga arrived with the newly appointed commander of Malacca, Francisco Rodrigues, along with other reinforcements. The commander immediately summoned a council to discuss the situation and the best course of action. The Acehnese fleet was causing shortages in the city, so it was decided that it was urgent to organize a force to repel it. Thus, one carrack, one galleon, and eight half-galleys set out on November 16 to the mouth of the River Formoso, where the enemy fleet had shifted to. With the river in sight, the Acehnese fleet set out whilst the wind was in their favour to meet the Portuguese. Despite being outnumbered the Lusitanian galleys positioned themselves ahead of the carrack and the galleon to board the Acehnese galleys in the front. The crews of the galleys fired volleys of shrapnel and matchlock fire and threw gunpowder grenades, while the carrack and the galleon fired their heavy caliber artillery, sinking many Acehnese galleys. Despite having Ottoman gunners and cannons, the Acehnese artillery was not effective. Once their flagship, a very large galley with over 200 fighting men, was boarded and its flag taken by the Portuguese, the remainder of the Acehnese fleet scattered, having lost four galleys and five half-galleys, with several more sunk or beached.

== See also ==
- War of the League of the Indies
- Siege of Malacca (1568)
- Portuguese Malacca
- Acehnese-Portuguese conflicts
