= Sultan Hadlirin =

Sultan Hadlirin or also known as Toyib of Kalinyamat, is the duke (Javanese: adipati) of Kalinyamat, a vassal of Demak Sultanate. He was dubbed as Sultan Hadlirin because he came to Jepara to propagate Islam in Java. Sultan Hadlirin's wife is the princess of Demak, the daughter of Demak Sultan Trenggana, Ratna Kencana, which popularly known as Ratu Kalinyamat.

Sultan of Hadlirin ruled te area now corresponds to the Jepara Regency, Kudus Regency, Pati Regency, Rembang Regency and Mataram.

He was of non-Javanese origin. Some version mentioned him as a Chinese Muslim merchant named Win Tang stranded on Jepara shore after his ship was wrecked by storm, and then he became the disciple of Sunan Kudus and became the son in law of Demak Sultan Trenggana. Another version mentioned that Win Tang origin was from Aceh. His real name was Prince Toyib, one of the son of Aceh Sultan, Sultan Mughayat Syah (1514–1528). Toyib went on an adventure to China and adopted as a son of a Chinese minister Tjie Hwio Gwan. Win Tang was a Javanese pronunciation of Tjie Bin Thang.

Sultan Hadlirin was murdered by Arya Penangsang when he returned to Kalinyamat from Kudus Regency after he met Sunan Kudus.
