= Siege of Malacca (1575) =

- Part of War of the League of the Indies and Acehnese–Portuguese conflicts
Date	January 31, 1575 – February 17, 1575
Location	Malacca
Result	Portuguese victory

Belligerents
Portuguese Empire	(Aceh Sultanate) Sultanate of Aceh

Commanders and leaders
Tristão Vaz da Veiga	Unknown

Strength
150 soldiers, plus native allies	113 vessels (including 40 galleys)

Casualties and losses
Unknown	Unknown

The siege of Malacca occurred in 1575, when the Sultan of Aceh attacked the Portuguese city of Malacca. The Catholic forces resisted the attack and the Muslims were routed.

== Overview ==
Although every attempt to conquer Malacca's had so far failed, the Acehnese still maintained hopes that the Portuguese might be caught debilitated after fighting two consecutive sieges. Indeed, the previous Attacks had left the Portuguese Garrison decimated, crops destroyed, and foodstuffs and gunpowder in the city nearly exhausted.

Thus in the final day of January 1575, a new Acehnese armada composed of 113 vessels, which included 40 galleys, once more laid siege to Malacca. The captain of Malacca Tristão Vaz da Veiga had gotten reports of the imminent threat, and so had dispatched the merchants away from Malacca on their vessels (to prevent their collusion with the Acehnese), merchant ships to fetch supplies in Bengal and Pegu, and urgent messages to the Viceroy in Goa requesting reinforcements, knowing full well these would not be forthcoming at least until May because of the monsoon season, if they came at all.

To keep the naval supply lines of the city open, he stationed 120 Portuguese soldiers on a galley, a caravel, and a carrack. Yet the disparity between forces was now too great, and the small flotilla was overwhelmed by the entire Acehnese fleet.

Within Malacca there were now only 150 Portuguese soldiers to defend it plus the corps of native soldiers; Tristão Vaz realized to hole them up in the walls could be disadvantageous, as it might hint the enemy of their dwindling numbers. In spite of this, he had his last remaining men perform short sorties to fool the Acehnese of their numbers.

Ultimately, the third siege of Malacca was brief: only seventeen days after landing, the Acehnese lifted the siege and sailed back to Sumatra. The Portuguese claimed the Acehnese commander hesitated in ordering a general assault, though it's just as possible the Acehnese retreated due to internal problems. In June, Dom Miguel de Castro arrived from Goa with a fleet of a galleass, three galleys, and eight half-galleys to relieve Tristão Vaz as captain of Malacca, along with 500 soldiers in reinforcements.
