= Kalinyamatan, Jepara =

Kalinyamatan is a subdistrict in Jepara Regency, Province Central Java, Indonesia.
