= War of the League of the Indies =

Indo-Portuguese war (1570–1575)

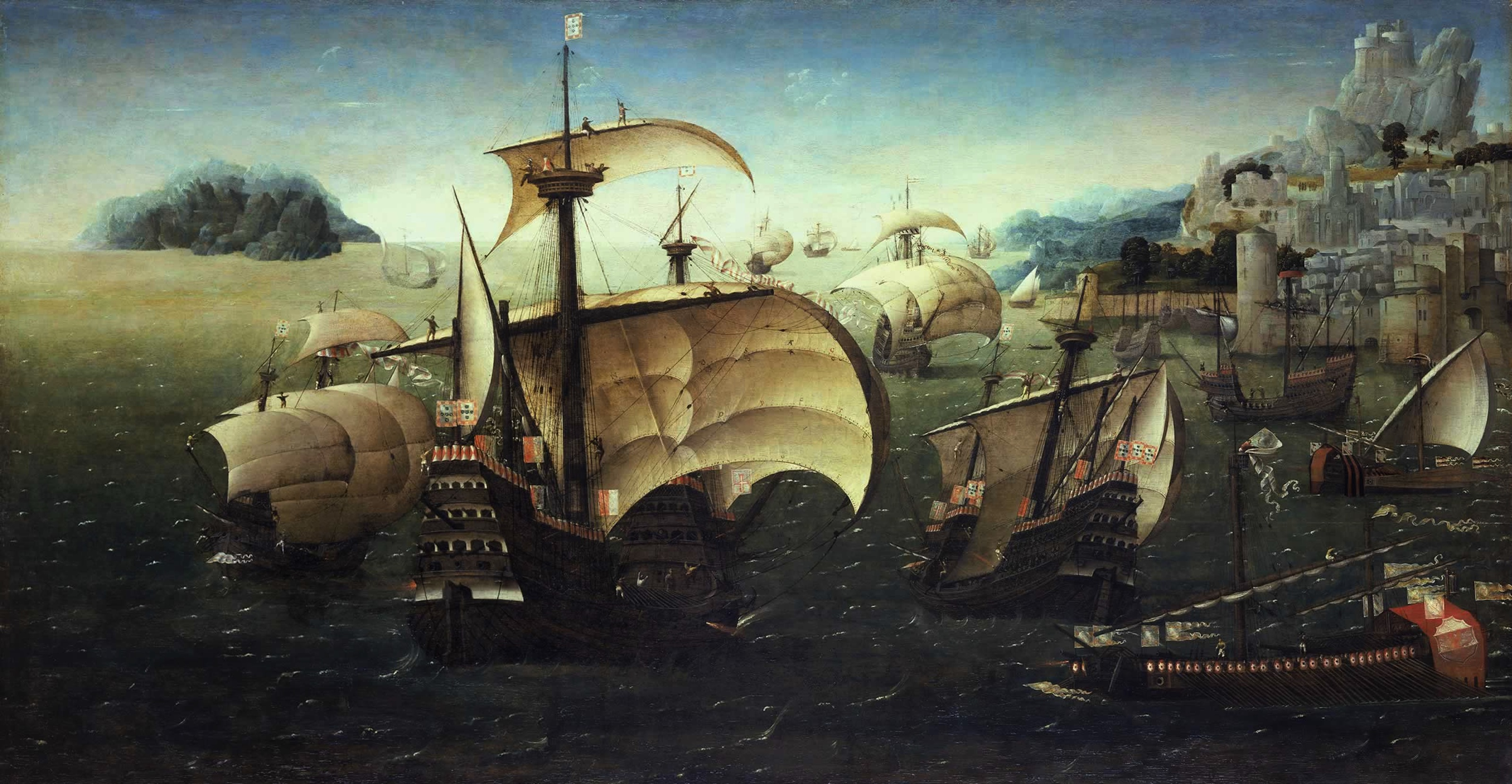
- 16th century Portuguese carracks (naus) and galleys
Date	December 1570–1575
Location	Western India and the Straits of Malacca
Result	Portuguese victory

Belligerents
Portuguese Empire	Sultanate of Bijapur; Sultanate of Ahmadnagar; Zamorin of Calicut; (Aceh Sultanate) Sultanate of Aceh Co-belligerents: Princely states of the Kanara coast Kalinyamat Sultanate Sultanate of Ternate Sultanate of Tidore Sultanate of Golkonda

Commanders and leaders
Dom Luís de Ataíde; Dom Luís Freire de Andrade; Dom Francisco de Mascarenhas; Dom Jorge de Castro (executed); Dom Luís de Melo da Silva	Ali Adil Shah I of Bijapur; Murtaza Nizam Shah I; (Aceh Sultanate) Alauddin al-Kahar; (Aceh Sultanate) Ali Ri'ayat Syah I; Mana Vikrama of Calicut; Kutti Pokkar Marakkar; Ki Demat

Strength
Over 5,000 soldiers (at the beginning of the war); 1,500 Christian lascarins 1,000 armed slaves 500 militia over 20 galleons or naus	Unknown

The War of the League of the Indies was a military conflict lasting from December 1570 to 1575, wherein a pan-Asian alliance attempted to overturn the Portuguese presence in the Indian Ocean. The pan-Asian alliance was formed primarily by the Sultanate of Bijapur, the Sultanate of Ahmadnagar, the Kingdom of Calicut, and the Sultanate of Aceh. It is referred to by the Portuguese historian António Pinto Pereira as "the League of Kings of India", "the Confederated Kings", or simply "the League". The alliance undertook a combined assault against some of the primary possessions of the Portuguese State of India: Malacca, Chaul, the Chale fort, and the capital of the maritime empire in Asia, Goa.

It was a total war, as the Portuguese were forced to mobilize every available means to resist the assault. The Portuguese successfully overcame nearly all of the sieges imposed by the "League", with the exception of a small fort on the outskirts of Calicut, which fell to the Zamorin, the ruler of Calicut. Although strategically insignificant, this was the first time that a Portuguese-held stronghold formally capitulated in India.

== Ottoman Empire ==
At the beginning of 1564, the Sunni Muslim Sultan of Ahmadnagar dispatched ambassadors to the Ottoman Empire with rich presents and a large tribute, hoping to gain Ottoman naval support against a strong Portuguese presence at sea. The Ottomans had gained access to the Red Sea following the annexation of Egypt in 1517, and Sultan Selim II agreed to join the effort against Portuguese possessions in India.

In 1571, 25 galleys and three galleons set out from Suez but were held back by revolts in Jeddah and Yemen. Combined with Ottoman campaigns in the Eastern Mediterranean, such as the Fourth Ottoman-Venetian War, this ensured that the Ottoman Empire would not play a significant role in the conflict.

== Portuguese preparations ==
Reports and rumors of the preparations of the Adil Shah and the Nizam began reaching Goa through Portuguese merchants and collaborators by 1569. The Portuguese Viceroy, Dom Luís de Ataíde, eventually dispatched a fleet of five galleons, one galley, and seven half-galleys carrying 800 men, commanded by Dom Luís de Melo da Silva, to Malacca on August 24, 1570 in an attempt to reinforce the city against a possible attack from the Sultanate of Aceh. Another fleet of three galleys and seventeen half-galleys carrying 500 men, commanded by Dom Diogo de Meneses, was sent to patrol the Malabar Coast to keep the vital trade routes with southern India, where the Portuguese city of Cochin was located, open and free of raiding from pirates.

== The Siege of Goa ==
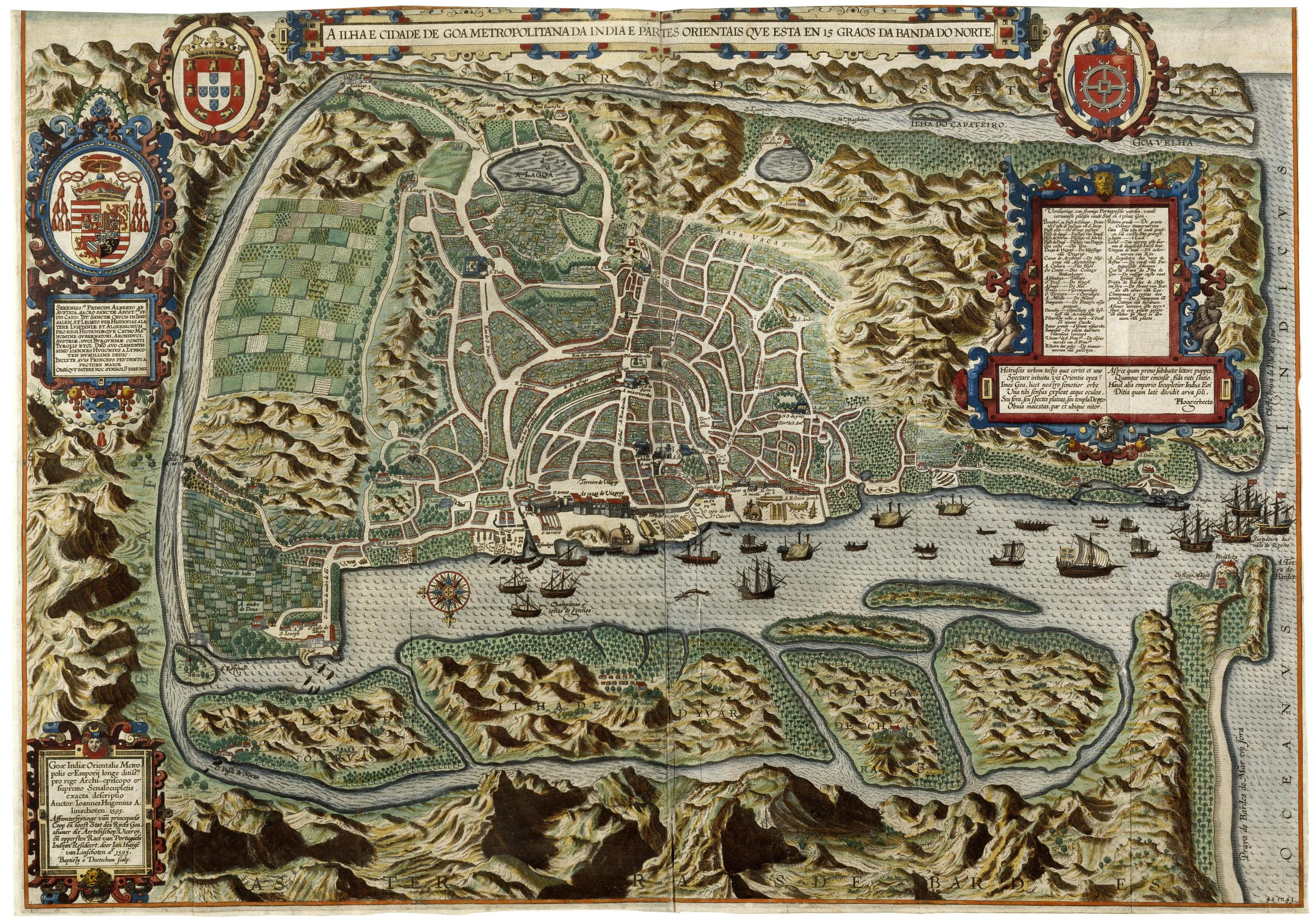
Portuguese Goa, ca. 1590. The heaviest fighting took place around Benastarim, southeast of the city (top left)

By December 28, 1570, General Nuri Khan had arrived with the vanguard of the army from Bijapur. Adil Shah arrived eight days later with the bulk of his forces. He established a camp around his red tent to the east of the island of Goa, with the infantry distributed ahead of Banastarim and the artillery in position to exchange fire with the Portuguese batteries. The artillery of Bijapur began fire on the fort, which was constantly repaired throughout the night when the cannons ceased fire. Throughout the Portuguese lines by the riverbanks, the Viceroy ordered torches and bonfires to be lit on isolated positions by night to give the impression of readiness and encourage the enemy to waste ammunition by firing on them.

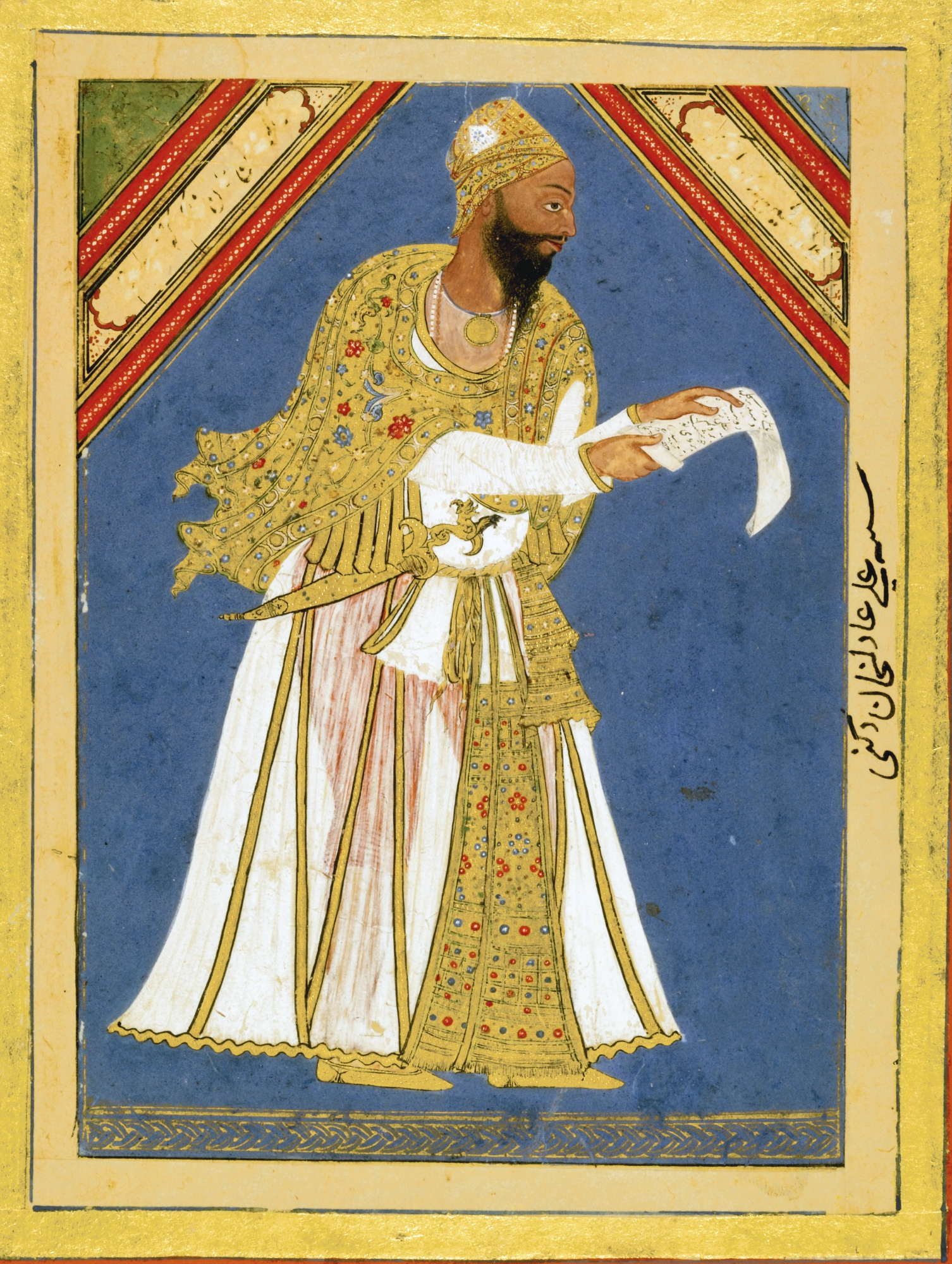
Ali Adil Shah, ruler of Bijapur between 1557 and 1579

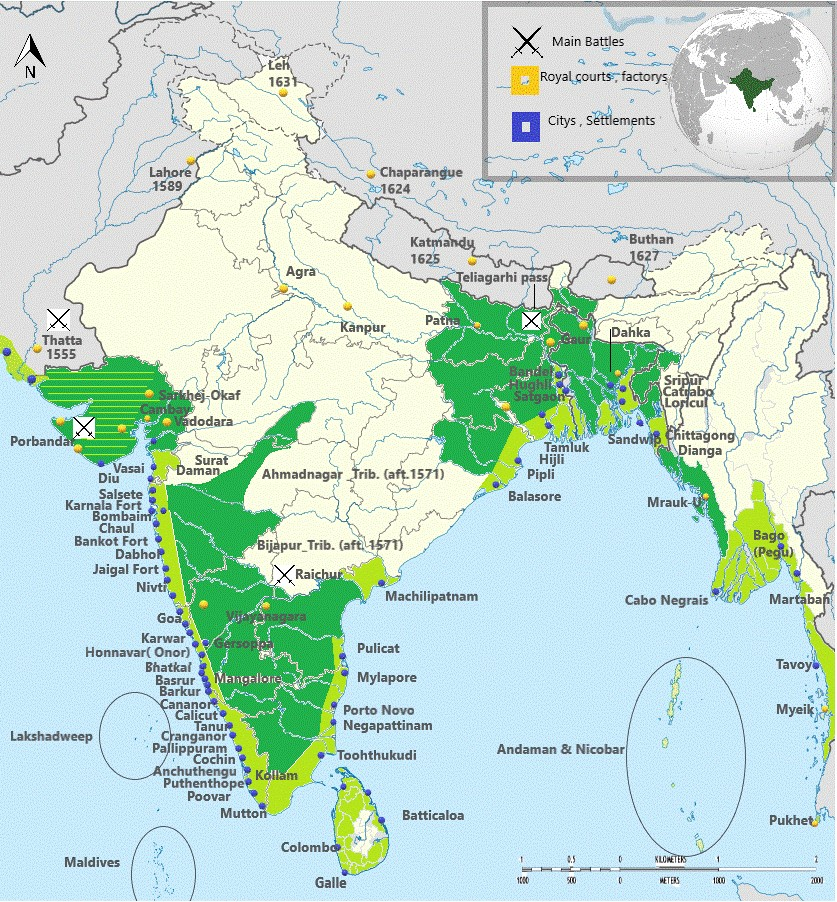
Portuguese presence in India and Bengal Gulf at max extent (16th and 17th century)

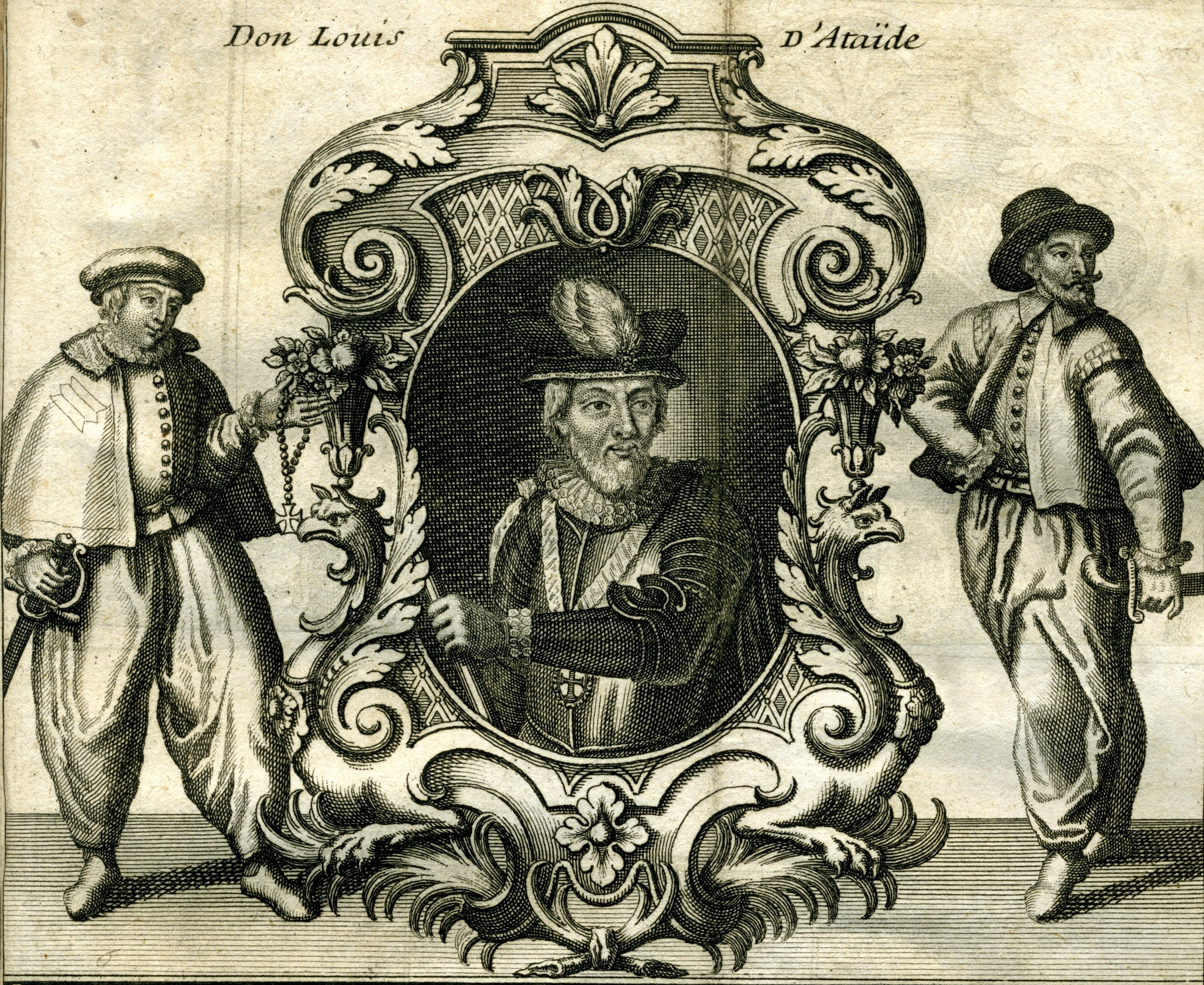
Dom Luís de Ataíde, 3rd Count of Atouguia, 24th Viceroy of Portuguese India between 1568–71 and 1578–81.

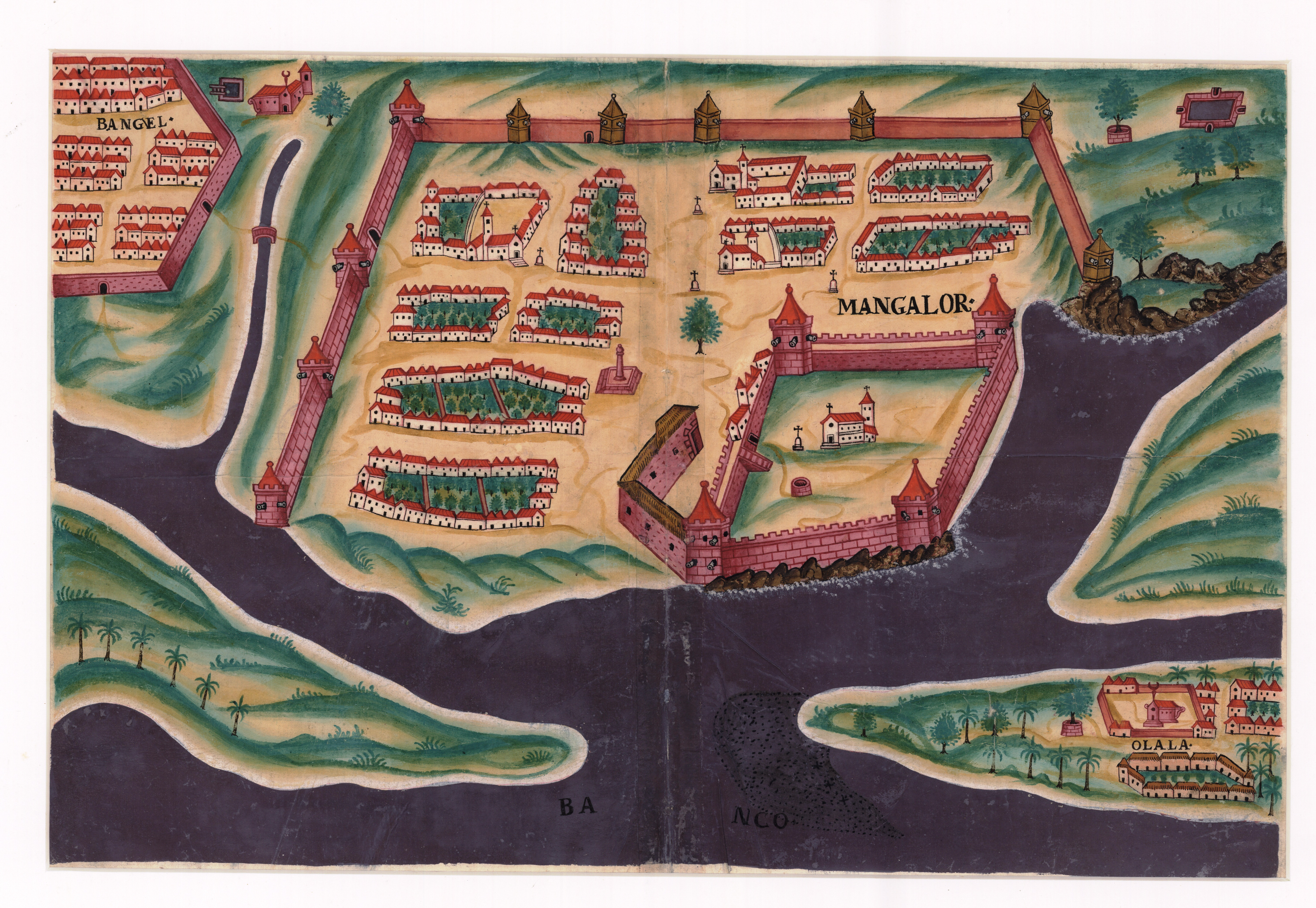
Portuguese fort of Mangalore. The town was protected by a stockade and entrenchments.

== Siege of Chaul ==
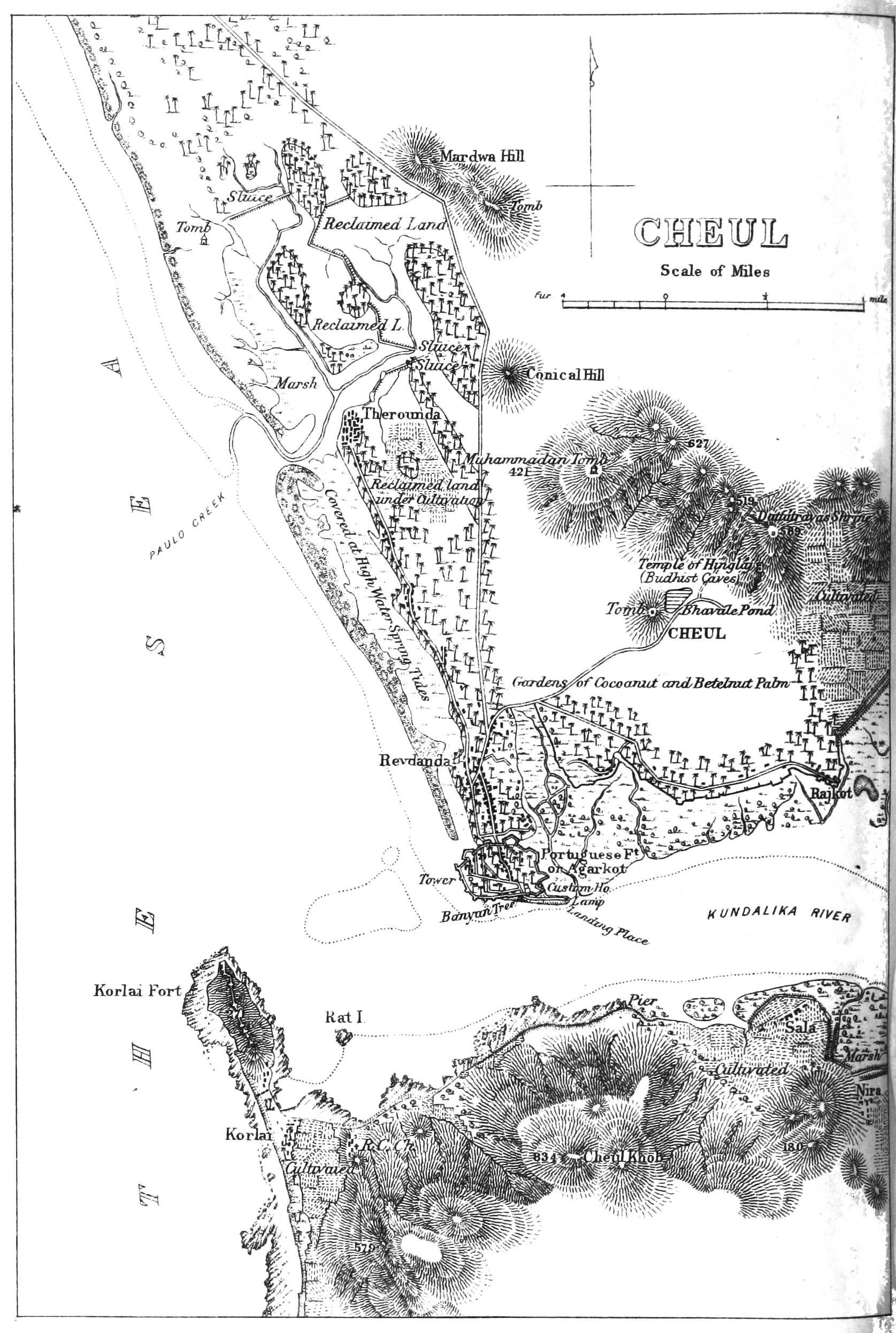
19th century British map of Chaul. The forces of Ahmadnagar were unable to prevent the Portuguese from reinforcing the city by sea.

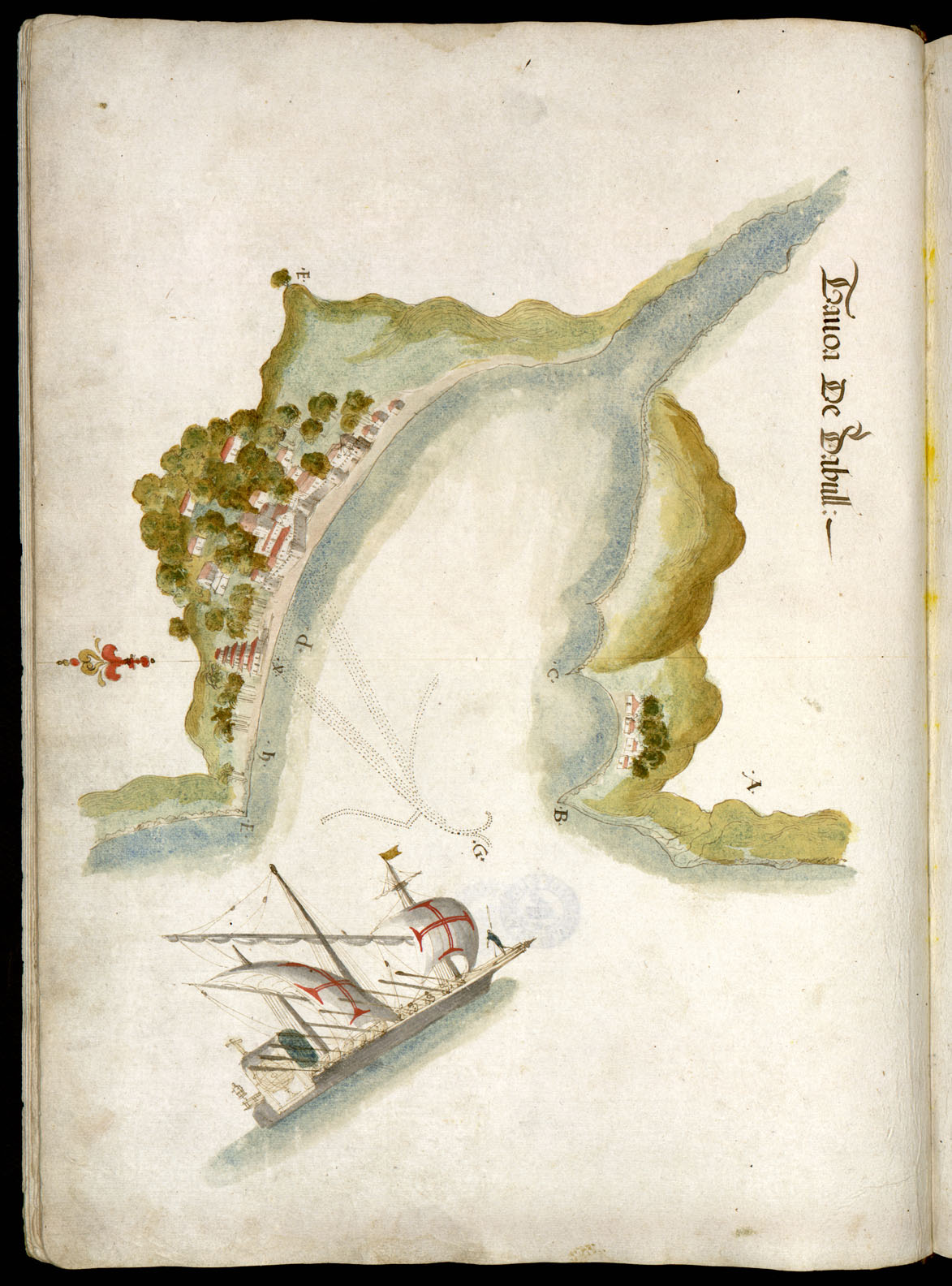
Portuguese bastard galley in Dabul harbour. Galleys were especially suited for naval and amphibious operations along the Indian coast and rivers.

The Portuguese warships were distributed in the river to the East, so as to deny the enemy an avenue of approach to the city along the river banks with their artillery. This way, the only possible way to approach the city would be through a swampy, narrow section to the north, forcing the enemy to bottleneck their forces and become bogged down in the mud.

The Portuguese numbered 900 soldiers, but each was fully equipped with plate armour and matchlocks. They outnumbered the 300 arquebusiers on the opposing side, but because both cavalry and elephants were rendered useless in a siege by the marshlands and trenches, the infantry would have to bear the brunt of the Portuguese assault.

In February, a small fleet of 5 half-galleys and 25 smaller crafts carrying 2,000 men from Calicut, commanded by Catiproca Marcá, arrived in Chaul to meet up with the forces of the Nizam, under cover of night. The Portuguese had five galleys and eleven foists in the harbour, but the Malabares avoided clashing with the Portuguese galleys.

At this point, a Portuguese captain Agostinho Nunes introduced for the first time to an innovation that the Portuguese historian António Pinto Pereira considered to have been critical in withstanding the enemy bombardment: he ordered his soldiers to dig a special trench with a firing parapet, protected by sloped earth—a "fire trench".

Yet the disparity in numbers was still immense, and despite frequent sorties, little by little, the Portuguese were forced to concede ground to the great mass of enemies. Retreating from several defensive lines, in May they were cornered in their last line of defense. For the following thirty days, the Portuguese desperately defended their lines against several waves of attackers, discharging volleys of matchlock fire and hurling gunpowder grenades constantly. Portuguese casualties amounted to over 400, Hindu auxiliaries and civilians notwithstanding.

The forces of the Nizam, however, failed to overcome the Portuguese in time. They had successfully held out through the monsoon season, until the weather finally allowed vessels to flow freely into the city, bearing fresh reinforcements nearly every day. On June 29, the Nizam ordered a general assault on the city. The Portuguese repelled the attack and pushed his army back to their camp in a complete rout, capturing cannon, weapons, and destroying the saps and siegeworks along the way. They had slain over 3,000 of the besiegers at the end of six hours of fighting. After this setback, on July 24 Murtaza Nizam Shah requested peace and withdrew his army.

== Siege of Chale, July–November 1571 ==
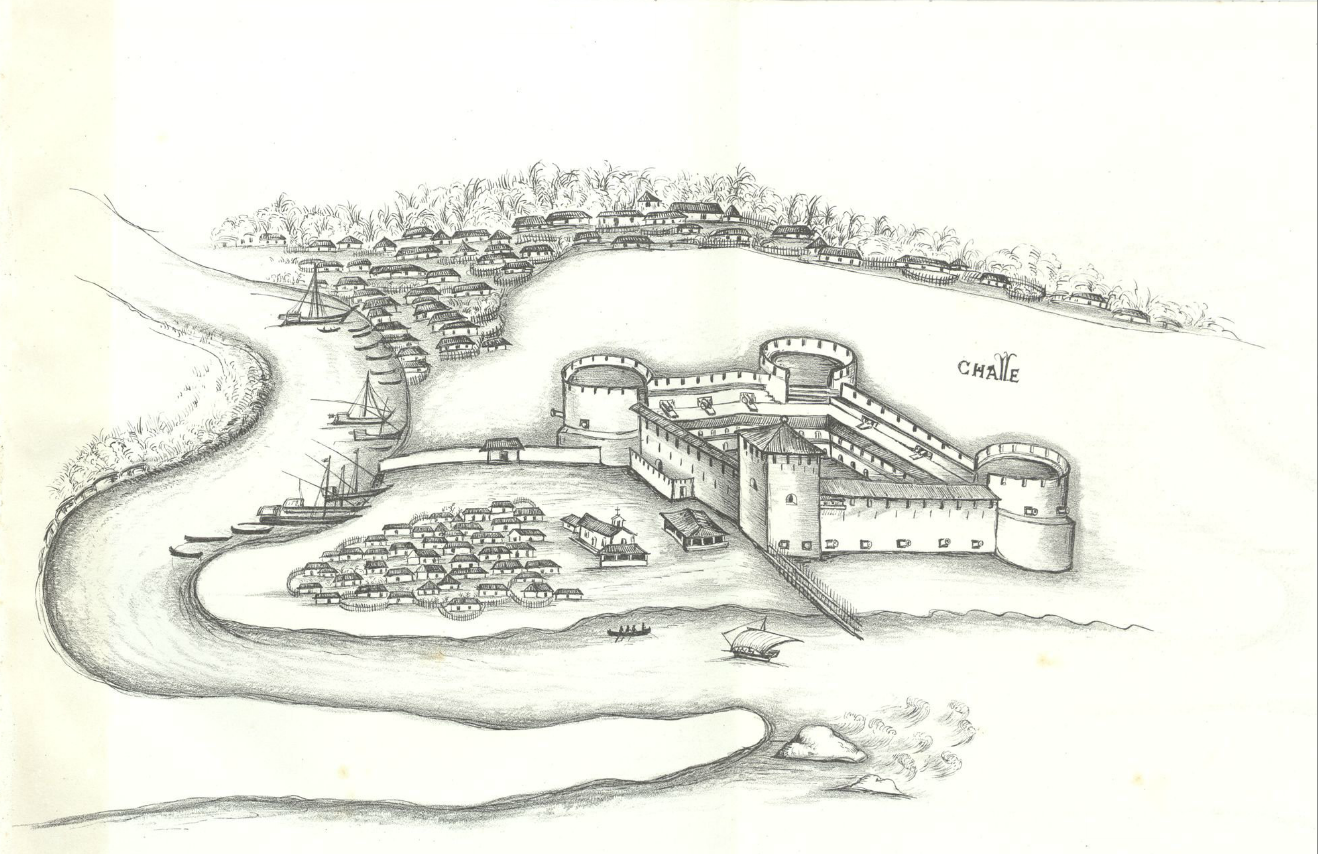
Chale fort, in Lendas da Índia

Despite the weather, the Portuguese managed to send reinforcements and a small amount of supplies through to the fortress when news of the attack reached Goa. The Zamorin placed an artillery battery on the mouth of the river that effectively blockaded Portuguese shallow draft vessels from passing through. The captain of the fortress, 80-year-old Dom Jorge de Castro, influenced by the King of Tanur, a local ally of the Portuguese, decided to surrender the fortress on November 4, 1571, in what became the first formal capitulation of territory by the Portuguese. The Zamorin immediately demolished the fort and sent Dom Jorge back to Goa.

With the withdrawal of the forces of Adil Khan from Goa, the Portuguese then passed on the offensive against the Zamorin, blockading Calicut and devastating the kingdom, until he was also forced to sue for peace.

== Sieges of Malacca ==
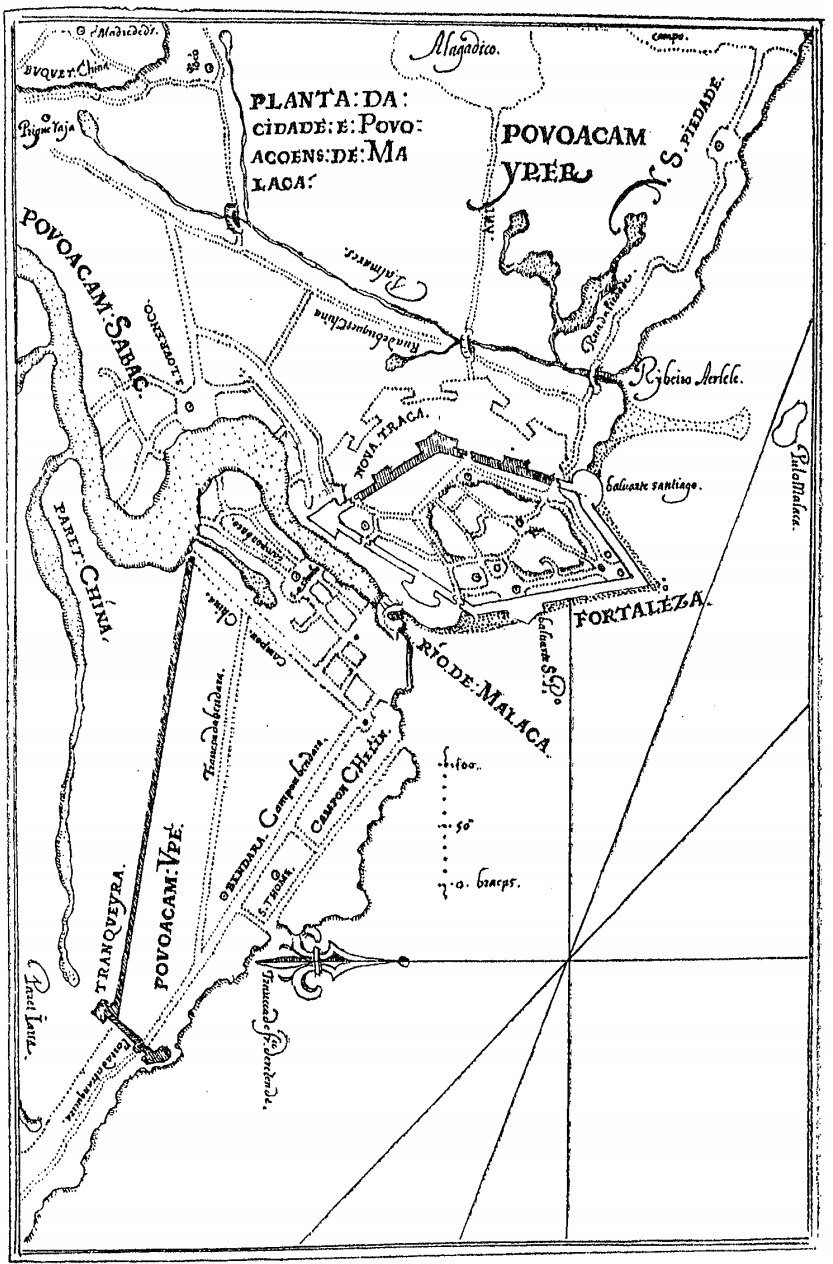
Portuguese Malacca and its surroundings in 1604

The reinforcements sent from Goa in August 1570, under the command of Dom Luís de Melo da Silva, proved critical in preventing Malacca from being besieged at the same time as Goa and Chaul. In November 1570, the Portuguese destroyed an Aceh fleet of 100 ships by the mouth of River Formoso to the south of Malacca, killing the prince-heir of Aceh, and thus forcing the Sultan to postpone the attack to a later date. Dom Luís de Melo then returned to India with his forces the following January, to assist in the defence of Goa.

=== Siege of Malacca, October–November 1573 ===
Nevertheless, by October 1573 Malacca was scarcely defended as most soldiers were embarked in commercial missions, and the Sultan of Aceh had gathered 7,000 men and a fleet of 25 galleys, 34 half-galleys, and 30 craft and requested assistance from the Queen of Kalinyamat (Japará in Portuguese) to besiege it.

On October 13, without waiting for its ally, the Aceh force landed south of Malacca and dealt severe casualties to the Portuguese who attempted a sortie. Thereafter they began attacking the fortress with incendiary projectiles, causing several fires but a sudden storm put out the fires and scattered the fleet, and the assault was called off. The Aceh commander then decided to establish a naval base by the Muar River and force the city to surrender through a naval blockade instead, capturing any passing tradeships that carried supplies to the city. An attempt to board a galleon and two carracks anchored by the Island of Naus (modern-day Pulau Melaka) was met with heavy resistance and suffered severe casualties from Portuguese gunfire.

On November 2, a carrack commanded by Tristão Vaz da Veiga arrived with the newly appointed captain of Malacca, Dom Francisco Rodrigues, along with important reinforcements. The captain immediately summoned a council to assess the situation. The Aceh fleet was causing severe shortages in Malacca, and it was decided that it was urgent to organize a force to repel it as soon as possible. Thus, a carrack, a galleon, and eight half-galleys were munitioned and set out on November 16 to the mouth of the River Formoso, where the enemy fleet had shifted to. With the river in sight, the Aceh fleet set out while the wind was in their favour to meet the Portuguese. Despite being outnumbered the Portuguese oar ships positioned themselves ahead of the carrack and the galleon to board the Acehnese galleys in the vanguard. The crews of the oar ships fired volleys of shrapnel and matchlock fire and threw gunpowder grenades, while the carrack and the galleon fired their heavy caliber artillery, sinking many Acehnese oar ships. Despite having Turkish gunners and cannon, the Acehnese artillery was not overly effective. Once their flagship, a very large galley with over 200 fighting men, was boarded and its flag taken down by the Portuguese, the remainder of the Aceh fleet scattered, having lost four galleys and five half-galleys, with several more sunk or beached due to the bad weather. The Portuguese suffered ten dead.

=== Siege of Malacca, October–December 1574 ===
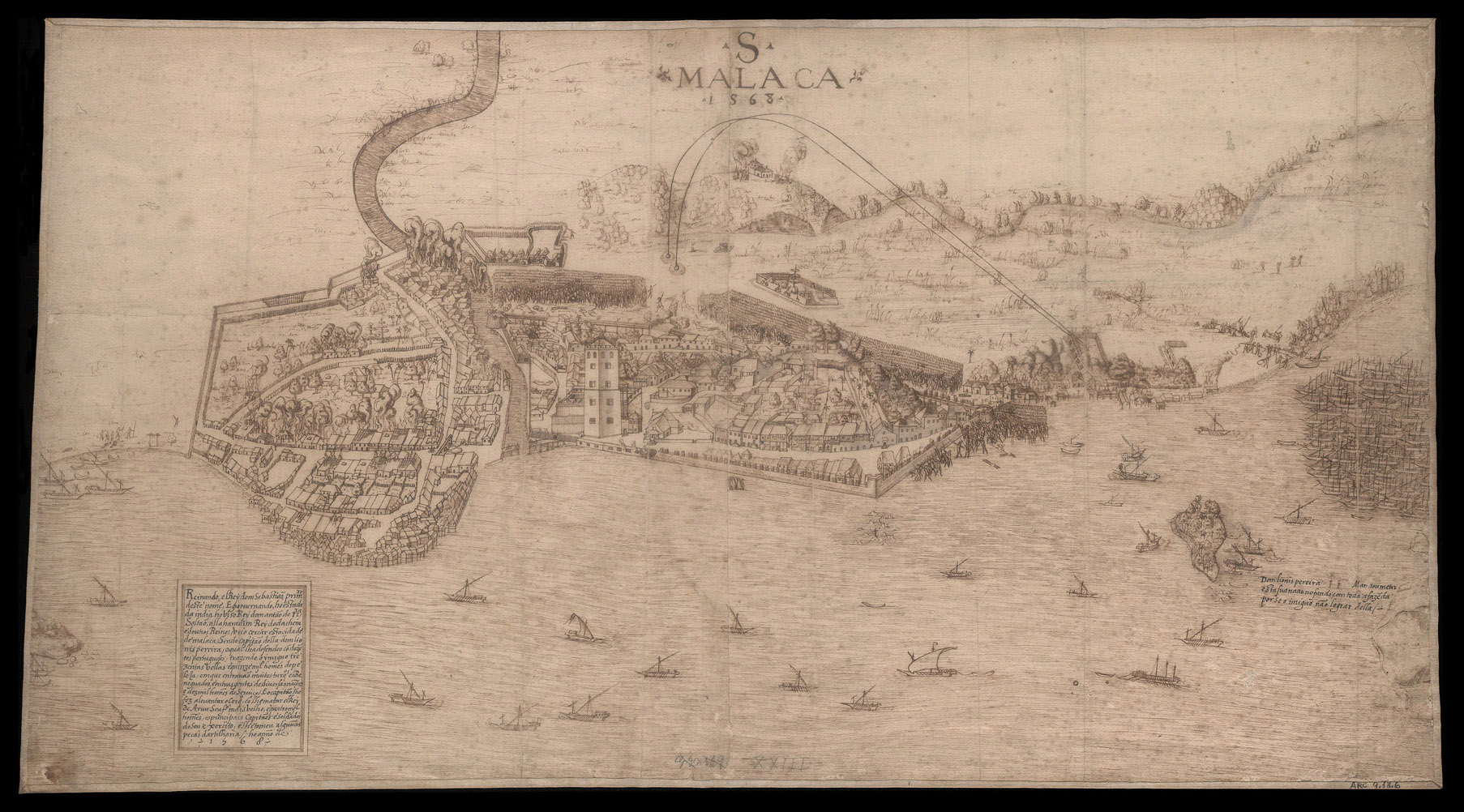
Malacca under siege, 1568

Despite the Aceh defeat, the Queen of Kalinyamat organized an armada with which to attack Malacca, composed of over 70 to 80 junks and over 200 craft carrying 15,000 men under the command of Kyai Demang—transliterated as Queahidamão, Quilidamão or Quaidamand by the Portuguese—although with very little artillery and firearms. Malacca was defended by about 300 Portuguese.

By October 5, 1574, the armada anchored within the nearby River of Malaios and began landing troops, but the besiegers suffered Portuguese raids that caused great damage to the army when assembling stockades around the city.

Afterwards, Tristão Vaz da Veiga ordered Fernão Peres de Andrade to blockade the river mouth with a small carrack and a few oarships, trapping the enemy army within it and forcing the Javanese commander to come to terms with the Portuguese. Not coming to any agreement, in December Tristão Vaz finally ordered his forces to withdraw from the river mouth. The Javanese hastily embarked in the few ships they had left, overloading them, and sailed out of the river, only to be then preyed upon by Portuguese ships, who chased them down with their artillery. The Javanese lost almost all of their junks and suffered about 7,000 dead at the end of the three-month campaign.

=== Final siege of Malacca, February 1575 ===
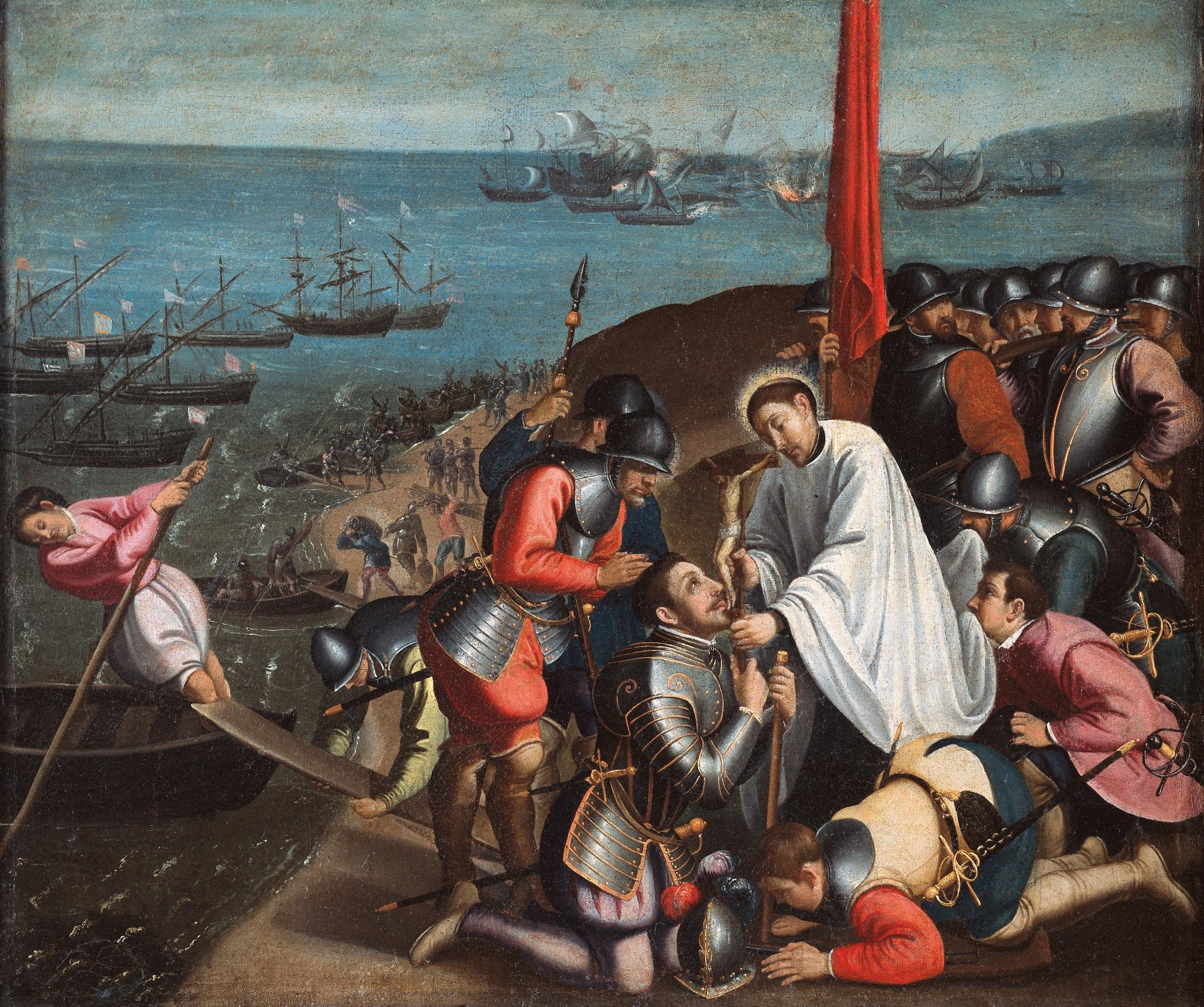
Portuguese troops in Malacca fighting the Acehnese, painting by André Reinoso.

In the final day of January 1575, a new Acehnese armada composed of 113 vessels, which included 40 galleys, once more laid siege to Malacca. The captain of Malacca Tristão Vaz da Veiga had received reports of the imminent threat. In response, he had dispatched the merchants away from Malacca on their vessels (to prevent their collusion with the Acehnese), merchant ships to fetch supplies in Bengal and Pegu, and urgent messages to the Viceroy in Goa requesting reinforcements, knowing these would not be forthcoming at least until May because of the monsoon season, if they came at all.

To keep the naval supply lines of the city open, he stationed 120 Portuguese soldiers on a galley, a caravel, and a carrack.

The third siege of Malacca was brief: only seventeen days after landing, the Acehnese lifted the siege and sailed back to Sumatra. The Portuguese claimed the Acehnese commander hesitated in ordering a general assault, though it is just as possible the Acehnese retreated due to internal problems. In June, Dom Miguel de Castro arrived from Goa with a fleet of a galleass, three galleys, and eight half-galleys to relieve Tristão Vaz as captain of Malacca, along with 500 soldiers in reinforcements.

== Aftermath ==
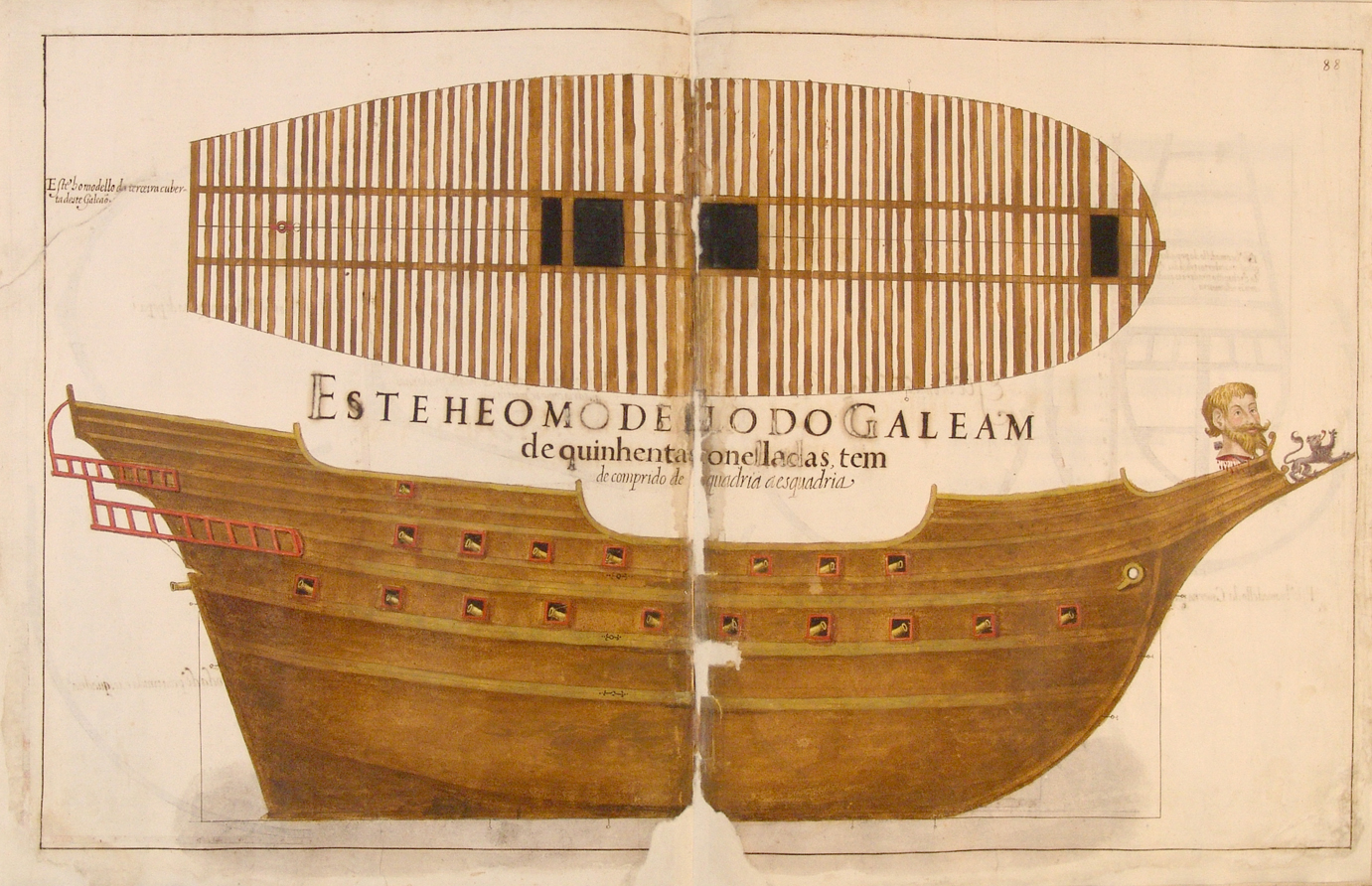
Portuguese galleon

By the passion of Our Lord, fear not for your fortresses built in our fashion in these parts, with moats, towers and artillery, well supplied and garrisoned, though you might be told there that they are under siege; if there is no betrayal, God willing, there is no reason to fear that the moors may contest your fortresses and anything you ought to lay hands upon; it should come as no surprise that kings and lords would besiege those you take from them, once and twice and ten times; but they won't take any fortress from the Portuguese wearing their helmets among the battlements.

— Letter of Afonso de Albuquerque to King Manuel I, 1512

Besides proving the difficulty of coordinating an attack on such scale, the combined assault of some of the most powerful kingdoms in Asia on Portuguese possessions failed to achieve any significant objectives. Neither did it decisively overturn Portuguese influence in the Indian Ocean. On the contrary, the rulers of Bijapur, Ahmadnagar, and the Zamorin were forced to come to terms that were favourable to the Portuguese: among other terms, they would charge no fees from Christian merchants, harbour no enemy fleets of the Portuguese, and resume paying tribute to Goa, in exchange for Portuguese assistance in clearing the western Indian coast of piracy and authorization to trade in Portuguese ports (provided every ship carried an appropriate trading license, or cartaz), essentially recognizing Portuguese dominion of the sea.

The fort of Chale had little strategic interest, and its loss did not represent a serious setback for the Portuguese. The fall of Vijayanagara however, had indirectly greater strategic implications for the Portuguese State of India, whose finances suffered a severe blow with the loss of the extremely lucrative horse trade with the Empire. It would take the assistance of other European powers to challenge the hegemony of the Portuguese, who would suffer their first serious setback with the fall of Hormuz, at the hands of combined Anglo-Persian force, about forty years later in 1622.

Dom Luís de Ataíde was succeeded in office by Dom António de Noronha in September 1571. On his arrival in Portugal in July 1572, Ataíde was solemnly received by King Sebastian, and awarded several honours including the command of the planned expedition to Morocco—which he turned down, for disagreeing with the nature of the undertaking. In 1578, he was reappointed Viceroy of India, and would in fact be the last Viceroy nominated by the Portuguese Crown before the Iberian Union. He died in office in 1581.

=== Situation in the Moluccas, 1570–1575 ===
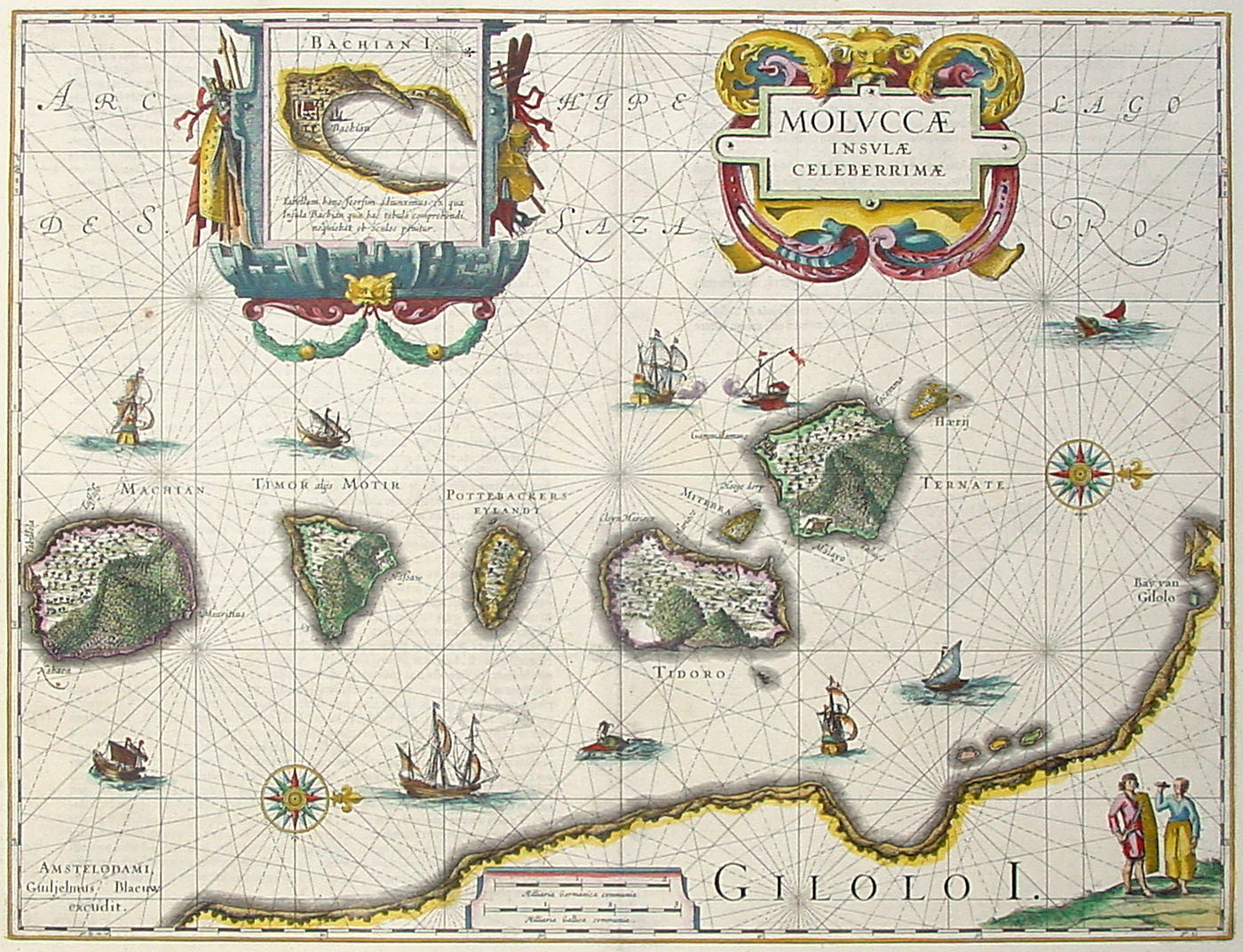
Moluccas Islands, Dutch engraving

In the Moluccas, the great distances made it extremely difficult, if not completely impossible, for the Portuguese Crown to direct a consistent policy in such a remote region, meaning it was often reduced to the initiative of individual captains assigned to the archipelago.

In late 1570, the captain of Ternate, Diogo Lopes de Mesquita had Sultan Khairun of Ternate assassinated, as the latter had been persecuting native Christians for some time. This proved untimely, as it provoked a major rebellion led by the late Sultan's son Baabullah (Babu in Portuguese), who allied with the Sultan of Tidore with support of the Javanese against the Portuguese. Although seemingly unrelated to the "league", the larger conflict in mainland Asia left the Portuguese incapable of sending sufficient reinforcements to the Moluccas in each sailing season, between the monsoons. In a prolonged conflict that extended to Portuguese positions in Gilolo, Ambon, and Banda, the critically isolated Portuguese could count on little aid to defend not just themselves, but also the nascent communities of local Christians.

Eventually, in 1575, with dwindling supplies and no hope of reinforcement, the less than 100 remaining defenders of the fortress of Ternate surrendered, at the end of a five-year long siege, to Sultan Babu. The Sultan then occupied the fort as his royal palace. Probably fearing retaliation from the Portuguese, he nonetheless allowed a few (about 18 married men) to remain on the island to maintain trade which, given the circumstances, the next Portuguese captain, Lionel de Brito, accepted upon arriving, just three days after the surrender, and was allowed to trade as usual.

In March 1576, the Portuguese began construction of a new fortress on Ambon, that henceforth became the center of Portuguese activity in the Moluccas. In 1578, as per request of its Sultan, the Portuguese built a new fort on Tidore, to which those still in Ternate relocated.

== See also ==
- Siege of Johor (1587)
- Ottoman–Portuguese conflicts (1586–1589)
