= Ratu Kalinyamat =

Javanese queen (died 1579)

Ratna Kencana
- Nimas Ratu Kalinyamat
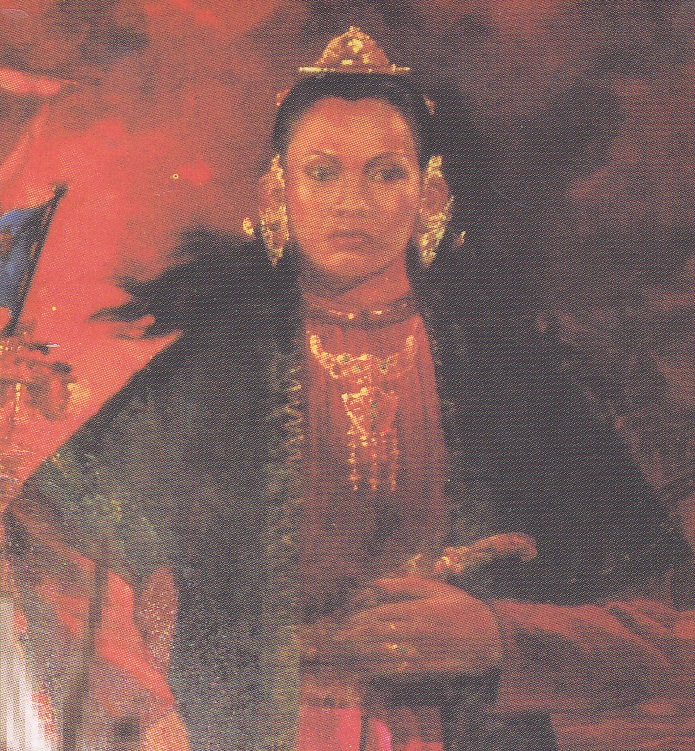
- Modern painting of Ratu Kalinyamat

Queen of Kalinyamat
- Reign: 1549–1579
- Predecessor: "Monarch Established"
- Successor: Pangeran Arya Jepara
- Spouse: Sultan Hadlirin
- Father: Sultan Trenggana
- Religion: Islam

Ratu Kalinyamat or Ratna Kencana (died 1579) was the queen regnant of Kalinyamat and Jepara, a Javanese Islamic polity on northern coast of Central Java in ca. 1549–1579. She is mainly known for her attack and naval expeditions against Portuguese Malacca.

== Life ==
She was the daughter of Sultan Trenggana of Demak and the spouse of Sultan Hadlirin. Ratna Kencana ascended the throne after the assassination of her brother, Sunan Prawoto, and her husband by Arya Penangsang.

=== Reign ===
Queen Kalinyamat ascended to the throne after the death of her husband, the Duke of Jepara as the couple was childless and there was no one else to take the throne. After the completion of the hermitage, she became Kanjeng Ratu Kalinyamat the queen of Kalinyamat that reign in Jepara. The coronation is marked by Surya Sengkala (chronogram): "Terus Karya Tataning Bumi" or approximately 1549 AD to the alleged date of 12 Rabi'ulAwal.

Queen Kalinyamat was described as an able and brave leader. Portuguese historical record "Da Asia" written by De Couto praised Queen Kalinyamat as "Senhora Rainha de Jepara ponderosa e rica"; which means 'the Queen of Jepara', a rich woman and has great power. Her reign was marked by her overseas campaigns in 1550 and 1574, against the Portuguese in Malacca.

== Legacy ==
She was awarded National Hero of Indonesia on 10 November 2023 by Joko Widodo. Five days later, a public service office in Jepara was named after her.
